= List of Chthoniidae species =

This is a list of the described species of the pseudoscorpion family Chthoniidae. The data is taken from Joel Hallan's Biology Catalog.

- Afrochthonius Beier, 1930

- Afrochthonius brincki Beier, 1955 — Lesotho
- Afrochthonius ceylonicus Beier, 1973 — Sri Lanka
- Afrochthonius godfreyi (Ellingsen, 1912) — Southern Africa
- Afrochthonius inaequalis Beier, 1958 — Southern Africa
- Afrochthonius natalensis Beier, 1931 — Southern Africa
- Afrochthonius reductus Beier, 1973 — Sri Lanka
- Afrochthonius similis Beier, 1930 — Namibia

- Allochthonius J.C. Chamberlin, 1929

- Allochthonius borealis Sato, 1984 — Japan
- Allochthonius buanensis W.K.Lee, 1982 — Korea
- Allochthonius kinkaiensis Sakayori, 2002 — Japan
- Allochthonius montanus Sakayori, 2000 — Honshu, Tochigi, Mount Kohshin, Japan
- Allochthonius opticus (Ellingsen, 1907) — Japan

- Allochthonius opticus opticus (Ellingsen, 1907) — Japan
- Allochthonius opticus coreanus Morikawa, 1970 — Korea
- Allochthonius opticus troglophilus Morikawa, 1956 — Japan

- Allochthonius shintoisticus J.C. Chamberlin, 1929 — Japan
- Allochthonius tamurai Sakayori, 1999 — Japan
- Allochthonius biocularis (Morikawa, 1956) — Japan
- Allochthonius ishikawai (Morikawa, 1954) — Japan

- Allochthonius ishikawai ishikawai (Morikawa, 1954) — Japan
- Allochthonius ishikawai deciclavatus (Morikawa, 1956) — Japan
- Allochthonius ishikawai kyushuensis (Morikawa, 1960) — Japan
- Allochthonius ishikawai shiragatakiensis (Morikawa, 1954) — Japan
- Allochthonius ishikawai uenoi (Morikawa, 1956) — Japan

- Allochthonius uyamadensis (Morikawa, 1954) — Japan

- Aphrastochthonius J.C. Chamberlin, 1962

- Aphrastochthonius alteriae Muchmore, 1977 — Mexico
- Aphrastochthonius cubanus Dumitresco & Orghidan, 1977 — Cuba
- Aphrastochthonius grubbsi Muchmore, 1984 — California
- Aphrastochthonius major Muchmore, 1973 — Mexico
- Aphrastochthonius pachysetus Muchmore, 1976 — New Mexico
- Aphrastochthonius palmitensis Muchmore, 1986 — Mexico
- Aphrastochthonius parvus Muchmore, 1972 — Mexico
- Aphrastochthonius patei Muchmore, 1982 — Mexico
- Aphrastochthonius pecki Muchmore, 1968 — Alabama
- Aphrastochthonius russelli Muchmore, 1972 — Mexico
- Aphrastochthonius similis Muchmore, 1984 — California
- Aphrastochthonius tenax J.C. Chamberlin, 1962
- Aphrastochthonius verapazanus Muchmore, 1972 — Guatemala

- Apochthonius J.C. Chamberlin, 1929

- Apochthonius coecus (Packard, 1884) — Virginia
- Apochthonius colecampi Muchmore, 1967 — Missouri
- Apochthonius diabolus Muchmore, 1967 — Arkansas
- Apochthonius forbesi Benedict, 1979 — Oregon
- Apochthonius grubbsi Muchmore, 1980 — California
- Apochthonius hobbsi Muchmore, 1994 — Ohio
- Apochthonius holsingeri Muchmore, 1967 — Virginia
- Apochthonius hypogeus Muchmore, 1976 — Virginia
- Apochthonius indianensis Muchmore, 1967 — Indiana
- Apochthonius intermedius J.C. Chamberlin, 1929 — Washington
- Apochthonius irwini R.O. Schuster, 1966 — California
- Apochthonius knowltoni Muchmore, 1980 — Wyoming
- Apochthonius magnanimus Hoff, 1956 — New Mexico
- Apochthonius malheuri Benedict & Malcolm, 1973 — Oregon
- Apochthonius maximus R.O. Schuster, 1966 — California
- Apochthonius minimus R.O. Schuster, 1966 — British Columbia, Oregon, Washington
- Apochthonius minor Muchmore, 1976 — Georgia
- Apochthonius moestus (Banks, 1891) — Eastern U.S.
- Apochthonius mysterius Muchmore, 1976 — Missouri
- Apochthonius occidentalis J.C. Chamberlin, 1929 — Oregon
- Apochthonius paucispinosus Muchmore, 1967 — West Virginia
- Apochthonius russelli Muchmore, 1976 — Alabama
- Apochthonius titanicus Muchmore, 1976 — Arkansas
- Apochthonius typhlus Muchmore, 1967 — Missouri

- Austrochthonius J.C. Chamberlin, 1929

- Austrochthonius argentinae Hoff, 1950 — Argentina, Brazil
- Austrochthonius australis Hoff, 1951 — Australia
- Austrochthonius bolivianus Beier, 1930 — Bolivia
- Austrochthonius cavicola Beier, 1968 — Australia
- Austrochthonius chilensis (J.C. Chamberlin, 1923)

- Austrochthonius chilensis chilensis (J.C. Chamberlin, 1923) — Chile, Argentina
- Austrochthonius chilensis magalhanicus Beier, 1964 — Chile
- Austrochthonius chilensis transversus Beier, 1964 — Argentina

- Austrochthonius easti Harvey, 1991 — western Australia
- Austrochthonius iguazuensis Vitali-di Castri, 1975 — Brazil
- Austrochthonius insularis Vitali-di Castri, 1968 — Crozet Islands
- Austrochthonius mordax Beier, 1967 — New Zealand
- Austrochthonius paraguayensis Vitali-di Castri, 1975 — Paraguay
- Austrochthonius parvus (Mello-Leitão, 1939) — Argentina
- Austrochthonius persimilis Beier, 1930 — Chile
- Austrochthonius rapax Beier, 1976 — New Zealand
- Austrochthonius semiserratus Beier, 1930 — Chile
- Austrochthonius tullgerni (Beier, 1931) — Southern Africa
- Austrochthonius zealandicus Beier, 1966 — New Zealand

- Austrochthonius zealandicus zealandicus Beier, 1966 — New Zealand
- Austrochthonius zealandicus obscurus Beier, 1966 — New Zealand

- Caribchthonius Muchmore, 1976

- Caribchthonius butleri Muchmore, 1976 — Virgin Islands
- Caribchthonius orthodentatus Muchmore, 1976 — Belize

- Centrochthonius Beier, 1931

- Centrochthonius koslovi (Redikorzev, 1918) — Tibet, India, Nepal
- Centrochthonius schnitnikovi (Redikorzev, 1934) — Russia
- Centrochthonius sichuanensis Schawaller, 1995 — Sichuan

- Chiliochthonius Vitali-di Castri, 1975

- Chiliochthonius centralis Vitali-di Castri, 1975 — Chile
- Chiliochthonius montanus Vitali-di Castri, 1975 — Chile
- Chiliochthonius usuriensis Beier, 1979 — Russia (?)

- Chthonius C.L. Koch, 1843

- Chthonius absoloni Beier, 1938 — Yugoslavia
- Chthonius agazzii Beier, 1966 — Italy
- Chthonius alpicola Beier, 1951 — Austria, Italy
- Chthonius apollinis Mahnert, 1978 — Greece
- Chthonius azerbaidzhanus Schawaller & Dashdamirov, 1988 — Azerbaijan
- Chthonius baccettii Callaini, 1980 — Italy
- Chthonius balazuci Vachon, 1963 — France
- Chthonius bogovinae Curcic, 1972 — Yugoslavia

- Chthonius bogovinae bogovinae Curcic, 1972 — Yugoslavia
- Chthonius bogovinae latidentatus Curcic, 1972 — Yugoslavia

- Chthonius brandmayri Callaini, 1986 — Yugoslavia
- Chthonius caprai Gardini, 1977 — Italy
- Chthonius caoduroi Callaini, 1987 — Italy
- Chthonius cavernarum Ellingsen, 1909 — Romania, Yugoslavia
- Chthonius cavophilus Hadzi, 1939 — Bulgaria
- Chthonius cebenicus Leclerc, 1981 — France
- Chthonius cephalotes (Simon, 1875) — France
- Chthonius chamberlini (Leclerc, 1983) — Algeria, France
- Chthonius comottii Inzaghi, 1987 — Italy
- Chthonius cryptus J.C. Chamberlin, 1962 — Greece
- Chthonius dacnodes Navás, 1918 — Spain, Azores, Italy
- Chthonius dalmatinus Hadzi, 1930 — Yugoslavia
- Chthonius densedentatus Beier, 1938 — Italy, Yugoslavia
- Chthonius diophthalmus Daday, 1888 — eastern Europe
- Chthonius doderoi Beier, 1930 — France, Italy

- Chthonius doderoi doderoi Beier, 1930 — France, Italy
- Chthonius doderoi horridus Beier, 1934 — Italy

- Chthonius ellingseni Beier, 1928 — Italy, Yugoslavia
- Chthonius elongatus Lazzeroni, 1970 — Italy
- Chthonius euganeus Gardini, 1991 — Italy
- Chthonius exarmatus Beier, 1939 — Yugoslavia
- Chthonius graecus Beier, 1963 — Greece
- Chthonius guglielmii Callaini, 1986 — Italy
- Chthonius halberti Kew, 1916 — France, Great Britain
- Chthonius herbarii Mahnert, 1980 — Crete
- Chthonius heterodactylus Tomosvary, 1882 — central Europe
- Chthonius heutaultae Leclerc, 1981 — France
- Chthonius hungaricus Mahnert, 1981 — Hungary
- Chthonius ilvensis Beier, 1963 — Italy
- Chthonius imperator Mahnert, 1978 — Greece
- Chthonius ischnocheles (Hermann, 1804) — Europe, U.S.

- Chthonius ischnocheles ischnocheles (Hermann, 1804) — Europe, U.S.
- Chthonius ischnocheles reductus Beier, 1939 — southern Europe
- Chthonius ischnocheles ruffoi Caporiacco, 1951 — Italy
- Chthonius ischnocheles stammeri Beier, 1942 — Italy

- Chthonius ischnocheloides Beier, 1974 — Italy
- Chthonius italicus Beier, 1930 — Italy
- Chthonius iugoslavicus Curcic, 1972 — Yugoslavia
- Chthonius jalzici Curcic, 1988 — Yugoslavia
- Chthonius jonicus Beier, 1931 — southern Europe
- Chthonius jugorum Beier, 1952 — Italy
- Chthonius karamanianus Hadzi, 1937 — Yugoslavia
- Chthonius lanzai Caporiacco, 1947 — Italy

- Chthonius lanzai lanzai Caporiacco, 1947 — Italy
- Chthonius lanzai vannii Callaini, 1986 — Italy

- Chthonius leoi (Callaini, 1988) — Sardinia
- Chthonius leruthi Beier, 1939 — Romania
- Chthonius lesnik Curcic, 1994 — Yugoslavia
- Chthonius lessiniensis Schawaller, 1982 — Italy
- Chthonius ligusticus Beier, 1930 — Italy
- Chthonius lindbergi Beier, 1956 — Crete
- Chthonius litoralis Hadzi, 1933 — Italy, Yugoslavia
- Chthonius lucifugus Mahnert, 1977 — France, Spain
- Chthonius macedonicus Curcic, 1972 — Yugoslavia
- Chthonius magnificus Beier, 1938 — Yugoslavia
- Chthonius malatestai Callaini, 1980 — Italy
- Chthonius mauritanicus (Callaini, 1988) — Morocco
- Chthonius mayi Heurtault-Rossi, 1968 — France
- Chthonius mazaurici Leclerc, 1981 — France

- Chthonius mazaurici mazaurici Leclerc, 1981 — France
- Chthonius mazaurici coironi Leclerc, 1981 — France

- † Chthonius mengei Beier, 1937 — fossil: Baltic amber
- Chthonius microphthalmus Simon, 1879 — France, Spain
- Chthonius mingazzinii Callaini, 1991 — Italy
- Chthonius minotaurus Henderickx, 1997 — Kournas Cave, Crete
- Chthonius monicae Boghean, 1989 — Romania
- Chthonius motasi Dumitresco & Orghidan, 1964 — Romania
- Chthonius multidentatus Beier, 1963 — Sicily
- Chthonius occultus Beier, 1939 — Yugoslavia
- Chthonius orthodactyloides Beier, 1967 — Turkey
- Chthonius orthodactylus (Leach, 1817) — Europe
- Chthonius pacificus Muchmore, 1968 — California
- Chthonius paganus (Hoff, 1961) — Colorado
- Chthonius paludis (J.C. Chamberlin, 1929) — southern U.S.
- Chthonius paolettii Beier, 1974 — Italy
- Chthonius persimilis Beier, 1939 — Yugoslavia
- Chthonius petrochilosi Heurtault, 1972 — Greece
- Chthonius pivai Gardini, 1991 — Italy
- Chthonius ponticoides Mahnert, 1975 — Greece
- Chthonius ponticus Beier, 1965 — Turkey
- Chthonius porevidi Curcic, Makarov & Lucic, 1998 — Krivosije, Knezlaz Pecina Cave, Montenegro
- † Chthonius pristinus Schawaller, 1978 — fossil: Baltic amber
- Chthonius prove Curcic, Dimitrijevic & Makarov, 1997 — Gornji Morinj, Serbia, Montenegro
- Chthonius pusillus Beier, 1947 — Austria
- Chthonius pygmaeus Beier, 1934 — central Europe

- Chthonius pygmaeus pygmaeus Beier, 1934 — central Europe
- Chthonius pygmaeus carinthiacus Beier, 1951 — central Europe

- Chthonius radjai Curcic, 1988 — Yugoslavia
- Chthonius raridentatus Hadzi, 1930 — Yugoslavia
- Chthonius ressli Beier, 1956 — Austria, France, Italy
- Chthonius satapliaensis Schawaller & Dashdamirov, 1988 — Russia
- Chthonius sestasi Mahnert, 1980 — Greece
- Chthonius shelkovnikovi Redikorzev, 1930 — western Asia
- Chthonius shulovi Beier, 1963 — Israel
- Chthonius stevanovici Curcic, 1986 — Yugoslavia
- Chthonius strinatii Mahnert, 1975 — Greece
- Chthonius submontanus Beier, 1963 — central Europe
- Chthonius subterraneus Beier, 1931 — Hungary, Yugoslavia

- Chthonius subterraneus subterraneus Beier, 1931 — Hungary, Yugoslavia
- Chthonius subterraneus meuseli Beier, 1939 — Yugoslavia

- Chthonius tadzhikistanicus Dashdamirov & Schawaller, 1992 — Tajikistan
- Chthonius tenuis L. Koch, 1873 — Europe, Algeria
- Chthonius thessalus Mahnert, 1980 — Greece
- Chthonius trebinjensis Beier, 1938 — Yugoslavia
- Chthonius troglobius Hadzi, 1937 — Yugoslavia
- Chthonius troglodites Redikorzev, 1928 — Bulgaria
- Chthonius tzanoudakisi Mahnert, 1975 — Greece
- Chthonius aegatensis (Callaini, 1989) — Sicilly
- Chthonius aguileraorum Carabajal Marquez, Garcia Carrillo & Rodriguez Fernandez, 2000 — Cadiz, Villaluenga del Rosario, Cueva de la Hiedra, Spain
- Chthonius amatei Carabajal Marquez, Garcia Carrillo & Rodriguez Fernandez, 2001 — Spain
- Chthonius anatolicus (Beier, 1969) — Iran, Turkey
- Chthonius anophthalmus (Ellingsen, 1908) — Algeria
- Chthonius apulicus (Beier, 1958) — Italy
- Chthonius asturiensis (Beier, 1955) — Spain
- Chthonius atlantis (Mahnert, 1980) — Morocco
- Chthonius balearicus (Mahnert, 1977) — Balearic Islands
- Chthonius bartolii (Gardini, 1976) — Italy
- Chthonius bauneensis (Callaini, 1983) — Sardinia
- Chthonius beieri (Lazzeroni, 1966) — Italy
- Chthonius bellesi (Mahnert, 1989) — Balearic Islands
- Chthonius berninii (Callaini, 1983) — Sardinia
- Chthonius bidentatus (Beier, 1938) — Yugoslavia
- Chthonius boldorii (Beier, 1934) — Italy, Yugoslavia
- Chthonius bolivari (Beier, 1930) — Spain
- Chthonius cabreriensis Mahnert, 1993 — Balearic Islands
- Chthonius cassolai (Beier, 1974) — Sardinia
- Chthonius catalonicus (Beier, 1939) — Spain
- Chthonius cavicola Gardini, 1990 — Italy
- Chthonius chius Schawaller, 1990 — Greece
- Chthonius concii (Beier, 1953) — Italy
- Chthonius corcyraeus (Mahnert, 1976) — Greece
- Chthonius corsicus (Callaini, 1981) — Corsica
- Chthonius creticus (Mahnert, 1980) — Crete
- Chthonius daedaleus (Mahnert, 1980) — Crete
- Chthonius distinguendus (Beier, 1930) — Spain
- Chthonius dubius Mahnert, 1993 — Canary Islands
- Chthonius elbanus (Beier, 1963) — Italy, Morocco
- Chthonius fuscimanus (Simon, 1900) — central Europe, Turkey
- Chthonius gasparoi (Gardini, 1989) — Greece
- Chthonius genuensis Gardini, 1990 — Italy
- Chthonius gestroi (Simon, 1989) — Italy
- Chthonius gibbus (Beier, 1953) — Spain, Italy
- Chthonius girgentiensis (Mahnert, 1982) — Malta
- Chthonius giustii (Callaini, 1981) — Corsica
- Chthonius gracilimanus Mahnert, 1997 — La Palma, Mazo, Salto de Tigalate, Canary Islands
- Chthonius grafittii (Gardini, 1981) — Sardinia
- Chthonius hiberus (Beier, 1930) — Spain
- Chthonius hispanus (Beier, 1930) — Spain, Portugal
- Chthonius insularis (Beier, 1938) — Yugoslavia
- Chthonius iranicus (Beier, 1971) — Iran
- Chthonius kabylicus (Callaini, 1983) — Algeria
- Chthonius kemza Curcic, Lee & Makarov, 1993 — Yugoslavia
- Chthonius kewi (Gabbutt, 1966) — Great Britain
- Chthonius longesetosus (Mahnert, 1976) — Morocco
- Chthonius lucanus (Callaini, 1984) — Italy
- Chthonius machadoi (Vachon, 1940) — Spain, Morocco

- Chthonius machadoi machadoi (Vachon, 1940) — Spain, Morocco
- Chthonius machadoi canariensis (Beier, 1965) — Canary Islands

- Chthonius mahnerti (Zaragoza, 1984) — Spain
- Chthonius maltensis (Mahnert, 1975) — Malta
- Chthonius mariolae Carabajal Marquez, Garcia Carrillo & Rodriguez Fernandez, 2001 — Spain
- Chthonius maroccanus (Mahnert, 1980) — Morocco
- Chthonius mayorali Carabajal Marquez, Garcia Carrillo & Rodriguez Fernandez, 2001 — Spain
- Chthonius microtuberculatus (Hadzi, 1937) — Bulgaria, Yugoslavia
- Chthonius minous (Mahnert, 1980) — Crete

- Chthonius minous minous (Mahnert, 1980) — Crete
- Chthonius minous peramae (Mahnert, 1980) — Crete

- Chthonius minutus (Vachon, 1940) — Portugal
- Chthonius nanus (Beier, 1953) — Italy
- Chthonius nerjaensis Carabajal Marquez, Garcia Carrillo & Rodriguez Fernandez, 2001 — Spain
- Chthonius nidicola (Mahnert, 1979) — Switzerland
- Chthonius parmensis (Beier, 1963) — Italy
- Chthonius pieltaini (Beier, 1930) — Italy
- Chthonius pinai (Zaragoza, 1985) — Spain
- Chthonius platakisi (Mahnert, 1980) — Crete
- Chthonius poeninus (Mahnert, 1979) — Switzerland
- Chthonius ponsi Mahnert, 1993 — Balearic Islands
- Chthonius poseidonis Gardini, 1993 — Sardinia
- Chthonius pyrenaicus (Beier, 1934) — France, Spain
- Chthonius remyi (Heurtault, 1975) — Corsica
- Chthonius rimicola Mahnert, 1993 — Canary Islands
- Chthonius romanicus (Beier, 1935) — Greece, Iran
- Chthonius ruizporteroi Carabajal Marquez, Garcia Carrillo & Rodriguez Fernandez, 2001 — Spain
- Chthonius sacer (Beier, 1963) — Israel
- Chthonius samius (Mahnert, 1982) — Greece
- Chthonius schmalfussi Schawaller, 1990 — Greece
- Chthonius scythicus Georgescu & Capuse, 1994 — Romania
- Chthonius sendrai (Zaragoza, 1985) — Spain
- Chthonius serbicus (Hadzi, 1937) — Bulgaria, Yugoslavia
- Chthonius setosus Mahnert, 1993 — Canary Islands
- Chthonius siculus (Beier, 1961) — Italy, Spain
- Chthonius siscoensis (Heurtault, 1975) — Corsica
- Chthonius tetrachelatus (Preyssler, 1790) — Cosmopolitan
- Chthonius troglophilus (Beier, 1920) — Italy
- Chthonius tuberculatus (Hadzi, 1937) — central Europe, Greece
- Chthonius vachoni (Heurtault-Rossi, 1963) — France
- Chthonius ventalloi (Beier, 1939) — Spain

- Chthonius ventalloi ventalloi (Beier, 1939) — Spain
- Chthonius ventalloi cazorlensis (Carabajal Marquez, Garcia Carrillo & Rodriguez Fernandez, 2001) — Spain

- Chthonius verai (Zaragoza, 1987) — Spain
- Chthonius virginicus (J.C. Chamberlin, 1929) — Eastern U.S.
- Chthonius zoiai Gardini, 1990 — Italy
- Chthonius abnormis (Beier, 1939) — Yugoslavia
- Chthonius caligatus (Beier, 1938) — Yugoslavia
- Chthonius cavernicola (Beier, 1938) — Yugoslavia
- Chthonius cerberus (Beier, 1938) — Yugoslavia
- Chthonius globifer (Simon, 1879) — France, Switzerland
- Chthonius pancici (Curbic, 1972) — Yugoslavia
- Chthonius polychaetus (Hadzi, 1937) — Yugoslavia
- Chthonius purgo Curcic, Lee & Makarov, 1993 — Yugoslavia
- Chthonius simplex (Beier, 1939) — Yugoslavia
- Chthonius spelaeophilus (Hadzi, 1930) — Yugoslavia

- Chthonius spelaeophilus spelaeophilus (Hadzi, 1930) — Yugoslavia
- Chthonius spelaeophilus histricus (Beier, 1931) — Yugoslavia, Italy

- Chthonius vandeli (Dumitresco & Orghidan, 1964) — Romania
- Chthonius californicus (J.C. Chamberlin, 1929) — California
- Chthonius oregonicus (Muchmore, 1968) — Oregon
- Chthonius spingolus (R.O. Schuster, 1962) — California
- Chthonius karamani (Hadzi, 1933) — Yugoslavia
- Chthonius rogatus (Beier, 1938) — Yugoslavia

- Congochthonius Beier, 1959

- Congochthonius nanus Beier, 1959 — Democratic Republic of Congo

- Drepanochthonius Beier, 1964

- Drepanochthonius horridus Beier, 1964 — Chile

- Francochthonius Vitali-di Castri, 1975

- Francochthonius Vitali-di Castri, 1975 — Chile

- Kleptochthonius J.C. Chamberlin, 1949

- Kleptochthonius crosbyi (J.C. Chamberlin, 1929) — Kentucky, North Carolina
- Kleptochthonius geophilus Malcolm & J.C. Chamberlin, 1961 — Oregon
- Kleptochthonius griseomanus Muchmore, 2000 — Hoosier National Forest, Indian Cave, Indiana
- Kleptochthonius inusitatus Muchmore, 1994 — Ohio
- Kleptochthonius lewisorum Muchmore, 2000 — Harrison County, Baelz Cave, Indiana
- Kleptochthonius magnus Muchmore, 1966 — Tennessee
- Kleptochthonius multispinosus (Hoff, 1945) — Eastern U.S.
- Kleptochthonius oregonus Malcolm & J.C. Chamberlin, 1961 — Oregon
- Kleptochthonius polychaetus Muchmore, 1994 — Virginia
- Kleptochthonius sheari Muchmore, 1994 — West Virginia
- Kleptochthonius affinis (Muchmore, 1976) — Tennessee
- Kleptochthonius anophthalmus (Muchmore, 1970) — Virginia
- Kleptochthonius attenuatus (Malcolm & J.C. Chamberlin, 1961) — Kentucky
- Kleptochthonius barri (Muchmore, 1965) — Tennessee
- Kleptochthonius binoculatus (Muchmore, 1974) — Virginia
- Kleptochthonius cerberus (Malcolm & J.C. Chamberlin, 1961) — Kentucky
- Kleptochthonius charon (Muchmore, 1965) — Tennessee
- Kleptochthonius daemonius (Muchmore, 1965) — Tennessee
- Kleptochthonius erebicus (Muchmore, 1965) — Kentucky
- Kleptochthonius gertschi (Malcolm & J.C. Chamberlin, 1961) — Virginia
- Kleptochthonius hageni (Muchmore, 1963) — Kentucky
- Kleptochthonius henroti (Vachon, 1952) West Virginia
- Kleptochthonius hetricki (Muchmore, 1974) — West Virginia
- Kleptochthonius hubrichti (Muchmore, 1965) — Kentucky
- Kleptochthonius infernalis (Malcolm & J.C. Chamberlin, 1961) — Tennessee
- Kleptochthonius krekeleri (Muchmore, 1965) — Kentucky
- Kleptochthonius lutzi (Malcolm & J.C. Chamberlin, 1961); — Tennessee
- Kleptochthonius microphthalmus (Malcolm & J.C. Chamberlin, 1961) — Kentucky
- Kleptochthonius myoplus (Malcolm & J.C. Chamberlin, 1961) — Tennessee
- Kleptochthonius orpheus (Muchmore, 1965) — West Virginia
- Kleptochthonius packardi (Hagen, 1879)
- Kleptochthonius pluto (Muchmore, 1965) — Tennessee
- Kleptochthonius proserpinae (Muchmore, 1965) — West Virginia
- Kleptochthonius proximosetus (Muchmore, 1976) — Virginia
- Kleptochthonius regulus (Muchmore, 1970) — Virginia
- Kleptochthonius rex (Malcolm & J.C. Chamberlin, 1961) — Tennessee
- Kleptochthonius similis (Muchmore, 1976) — Virginia
- Kleptochthonius stygius (Muchmore, 1965) — Tennessee
- Kleptochthonius tantalus (Muchmore, 1966) — Tennessee

- Lagynochthonius Beier, 1951

- Lagynochthonius annamensis (Beier, 1951) — Vietnam
- Lagynochthonius arctus (Beier, 1967) — New Guinea
- Lagynochthonius australicus (Beier, 1966) — Australia
- Lagynochthonius bakeri (J.C. Chamberlin, 1929) — Philippines
- Lagynochthonius brincki (Beier, 1973) — Sri Lanka
- Lagynochthonius curvidigitatus Mahnert, 1997 — Tenerife, Cueva Felipe Reventon, Canary Islands
- Lagynochthonius dybasi (Beier, 1957) — Palau
- Lagynochthonius exiguus (Beier, 1952) — Malaysia
- Lagynochthonius flavus (Mahnert, 1986) — Kenya
- Lagynochthonius guasirih (Mahnert, 1988) — Sarawak
- Lagynochthonius hamatus Harvey, 1988 — Sumatra
- Lagynochthonius himalayensis (Morikawa, 1968) — Nepal
- Lagynochthonius hygricus Murthy & Ananthakrishnan, 1977 — India
- Lagynochthonius indicus (Murthy & Ananthakrishnan, 1977) — India
- Lagynochthonius johni (Redikorzev, 1922) — Indonesia, Philippines
- Lagynochthonius kapi Harvey, 1988 — Indonesia
- Lagynochthonius kenyensis (Mahnert, 1986) — Kenya
- Lagynochthonius mordor Harvey, 1989 — Australia
- Lagynochthonius nagaminei (Sato, 1983) — Japan
- Lagynochthonius novaeguineae (Beier, 1965) — New Guinea
- Lagynochthonius paucedentatus (Beier, 1955) — Malaysia
- Lagynochthonius ponapensis (Beier, 1957) — Caroline Islands
- Lagynochthonius roeweri (J.C. Chamberlin, 1930) — Java
- Lagynochthonius salomonensis (Beier, 1966) — Solomon Islands
- Lagynochthonius sinensis (Beier, 1967) — China
- Lagynochthonius thorntoni Harvey, 1988 — Java
- Lagynochthonius tonkinensis (Beier, 1951) — Vietnam

- Malcolmochthonius Benedict, 1978

- Malcolmochthonius malcolmi Benedict, 1978 — Oregon
- Malcolmochthonius oregonus Benedict, 1978 — Oregon
- Malcolmochthonius perplexus Benedict, 1978 — California

- Maorichthonius J.C. Chamberlin, 1925

- Maorichthonius mortenseni J.C. Chamberlin, 1925 — New Zealand

- Mexichthonius Muchmore, 1975

- Mexichthonius exoticus Muchmore, 1996 — Texas
- Mexichthonius pacal Muchmore, 1978 — Mexico
- Mexichthonius unicus Muchmore, 1975 — Mexico

- Mundochthonius J.C. Chamberlin, 1929

- Mundochthonius alpinus Beier, 1947 — Austria
- Mundochthonius basarukini Schawaller, 1989 — Russia
- Mundochthonius bifurcatus Kim & Hong, 1994 — South Korea
- Mundochthonius carpaticus Rafalski, 1948 — Poland, Ukraine
- Mundochthonius cavernicola Muchmore, 1968 — Illinois
- Mundochthonius decoui Dumitresco & Orghidan, 1970 — Romania
- Mundochthonius dominicanus Muchmore, 1996 — Dominican Republic
- Mundochthonius erosidens J.C. Chamberlin, 1929 — California
- Mundochthonius holsingeri Benedict & Malcolm, 1974 — Virginia
- Mundochthonius japonicus J.C. Chamberlin, 1929 — Japan

- Mundochthonius japonicus japonicus J.C. Chamberlin, 1929 — Japan
- Mundochthonius japonicus imadatei Morikawa, 1956 — Japan
- Mundochthonius japonicus scolytidis Morikawa, 1954 — Japan
- Mundochthonius japonicus tripartitus Morikawa, 1956 — Japan

- Mundochthonius kiyoshii Sakayori, 2002 — Japan
- Mundochthonius magnus J.C. Chamberlin, 1929 — California
- Mundochthonius mexicanus Muchmore, 1973 — Mexico
- Mundochthonius minusculus Kim & Hong, 1994 — South Korea
- Mundochthonius montanus J.C. Chamberlin, 1929 — Colorado, New Mexico
- Mundochthonius pacificus (Banks, 1893) — western U.S.
- Mundochthonius rossi Hoff, 1949 — central U.S.
- Mundochthonius sandersoni Hoff, 1949 — Illinois
- Mundochthonius singularis Muchmore, 2001 — Fremont County, Canon City, Fly Cave, Colorado
- Mundochthonius styriacus Beier, 1971 — Austria
- Mundochthonius ussuricus Beier, 1979 — Russia

- Neochthonius J.C. Chamberlin, 1929

- Neochthonius amplus (R.O. Schuster, 1962) — California
- Neochthonius decoui (Georgescu & Capuse, 1994) — Romania
- Neochthonius imperialis Muchmore, 1996 — California
- Neochthonius stanfordianus J.C. Chamberlin, 1929 — California
- Neochthonius troglodytes Muchmore, 1969 — California

- Paraliochthonius Beier, 1956

- Paraliochthonius azanius Mahnert, 1986 — Kenya
- Paraliochthonius canariensis Vachon, 1961 — Canary Islands
- Paraliochthonius carpenteri Muchmore, 1984 — Bahamas
- Paraliochthonius hoestlandti Vachon, 1960 — Madeira Islands

- Paraliochthonius hoestlandti hoestlandti Vachon, 1960 — Madeira Islands

- Paraliochthonius insulae Hoff, 1963 — Jamaica
- Paraliochthonius johnstoni (J.C. Chamberlin, 1923) — Mexico
- Paraliochthonius martini Mahnert, 1989 — Canary Islands
- Paraliochthonius mirus Mahnert, 2002 — Canary Islands
- Paraliochthonius puertoricensis Muchmore, 1967 — Puerto Rico
- Paraliochthonius singularis (Menozzi, 1924) — Europe
- Paraliochthonius takashimai (Morikawa, 1958) — Japan
- Paraliochthonius tenebrarum Mahnert, 1989 — Canary Islands
- Paraliochthonius weygoldti Muchmore, 1967 — Florida

- Pseudochthonius Balzan, 1892

- Pseudochthonius arubensis Wagenaar-Hummelinck, 1948 — Aruba
- Pseudochthonius beieri Mahnert, 1978 — Republic of Congo
- Pseudochthonius billae Vachon, 1941 — Ivory Coast
- Pseudochthonius biseriatus Mahnert, 2001 — Minas Gerais, Itacarambi, Gruta Olhos dAgua, Brazil
- Pseudochthonius brasiliensis Beier, 1970 — Brazil
- Pseudochthonius clarus Hoff, 1963 — Jamaica
- Pseudochthonius congicus Beier, 1959 — Democratic Republic of Congo
- Pseudochthonius doctus Hoff, 1963 — Jamaica
- Pseudochthonius falcatus Muchmore, 1977 — Belize
- Pseudochthonius galapagensis Beier, 1977 — Galapagos
- Pseudochthonius gracilmanus Mahnert, 2001 — Bahia, Gruta Azul, Iraquara, Brazil
- Pseudochthonius heterodentatus Hoff, 1946 — Trinidad
- Pseudochthonius homodentatus J.C. Chamberlin, 1929 — Venezuela
- Pseudochthonius insularis J.C. Chamberlin, 1929 — St. Vincent
- Pseudochthonius leleupi Beier, 1959 — Democratic Republic of Congo
- Pseudochthonius moralesi Muchmore, 1977 — Mexico
- Pseudochthonius mundanus Hoff, 1963 — Jamaica
- Pseudochthonius naranjitensis (Ellingsen, 1902) — Ecuador
- Pseudochthonius orthodactylus Muchmore, 1970 — Brazil
- Pseudochthonius perreti Mahnert, 1986 — Kenya
- Pseudochthonius pulchellus (Ellingsen, 1902) — Ecuador
- Pseudochthonius ricardoi Mahnert, 2001 — Sao Paulo, Vale do Betari, Caverna Agua Suja, Brazil
- Pseudochthonius simoni (Balzan, 1892) — Venezuela
- † Pseudochthonius squamosus Schawaller, 1980 — fossil: Dominican amber
- Pseudochthonius strinatii Beier, 1969 — Brazil
- Pseudochthonius thibaudi Vitali-di Castro, 1984 — Guadeloupe
- Pseudochthonius troglobius Muchmore, 1986 — Mexico
- Pseudochthonius tuxeni Mahnert, 1979 — Brazil
- Pseudochthonius yucatanus Muchmore, 1977 — Mexico

- Pseudotyrannochthonius Beier, 1930

- Pseudotyrannochthonius australiensis Beier, 1966 — Australia
- Pseudotyrannochthonius bornemisszai Beier, 1966 — Australia
- Pseudotyrannochthonius dentifer (Morikawa, 1970) — Korea
- Pseudotyrannochthonius giganteus Beier, 1971 — Australia
- Pseudotyrannochthonius gigas Beier, 1979 — Australia
- Pseudotyrannochthonius gracilis Benedict & Malcolm, 1970 — California, Washington
- Pseudotyrannochthonius hamiltonsmithi Beier, 1968 — Australia
- Pseudotyrannochthonius incognitus (R.O. Schuster, 1966) — western U.S.
- Pseudotyrannochthonius jonesi (J.C. Chamberlin, 1962) — Australia
- Pseudotyrannochthonius kobayashii (Morikawa, 1956) — Japan

- Pseudotyrannochthonius kobayashii kobayashii (Morikawa, 1956) — Japan
- Pseudotyrannochthonius kobayashii akiyoshiensis (Morikawa, 1956) — Japan
- Pseudotyrannochthonius kobayashii dorogawaensis (Morikawa, 1960) — Japan

- Pseudotyrannochthonius kubotai (Morkawa, 1954) — Japan
- Pseudotyrannochthonius octospinosus Beier, 1930 — Chile
- Pseudotyrannochthonius queenslandicus Beier, 1969 — Australia
- Pseudotyrannochthonius rossi Beier, 1964 — Chile
- Pseudotyrannochthonius silvestrii (Ellingsen, 1905) — Chile
- Pseudotyrannochthonius solitarius (Hoff, 1951) — Australia
- Pseudotyrannochthonius tasmanicus Dartnall, 1970 — Tasmania
- Pseudotyrannochthonius typhlus Dartnall, 1970 — Tasmania
- Pseudotyrannochthonius undecimclavatus (Morikawa, 1956) — Japan

- Pseudotyrannochthonius undecimclavatus undecimclavatus (Morikawa, 1956) — Japan
- Pseudotyrannochthonius undecimclavatus kishidai (Morikawa, 1960) — Japan

- Pseudotyrannochthonius utahensis Muchmore, 1967 — Utah

- Sathrochthoniella Beier, 1967

- Sathrochthoniella zealandica Beier, 1967 — New Zealand

- Sathrochthonius J.C. Chamberlin, 1962

- Sathrochthonius crassidens Beier, 1966 — Australia
- Sathrochthonius insulanus Beier, 1976 — Lord Howe Island
- Sathrochthonius kaltenbachi Beier, 1966 — New Caledonia
- Sathrochthonius maoricus Beier, 1976 — New Zealand
- Sathrochthonius pefauri Vitali-di Castro, 1974 — Chile
- Sathrochthonius tuena J. C. Chamberlin, 1962 — Australia
- Sathrochthonius tullgreni J. C. Chamberlin, 1962 — Australia
- Sathrochthonius venezuelanus Muchmore, 1989 — Venezuela
- Sathrochthonius webbi Muchmore, 1982 — Australia

- Selachochthonius J. C. Chamberlin, 1929

- Selachochthonius cavernicola Lawrence, 1935 — Southern Africa
- Selachochthonius heterodentata Beier, 1955 — Southern Africa
- Selachochthonius serratidentaus (Ellingsen, 1912) — Southern Africa

- Spelyngochthonius Beier, 1955

- Spelyngochthonius beieri Gardini, 1994 — Sardinia
- Spelyngochthonius grafittii Gardini, 1994 — Sardinia
- Spelyngochthonius heurtaultae Vachon, 1967 — Spain, Sardinia
- Spelyngochthonius provincialis Vachon & Heurtault-Rossi, 1964 — France
- Spelyngochthonius sardous Beier, 1955 — Sardinia

- Stygiochthonius Carabajal Marquez, Garcia Carrillo & Rodriguez Fernandez, 2001

- Stygiochthonius barrancoi Carabajal Marquez, Garcia Carrillo & Rodriguez Fernandez, 2001 — Spain

- Troglochthonius Beier, 1939

- Troglochthonius doratodactylus Helversen, 1968 — Italy
- Troglochthonius mirabilis Beier, 1939 — Yugoslavia

- Tyrannochthoniella Beier, 1966

- Tyrannochthoniella zealandica Beier, 1966 — New Zealand

- Tyrannochthoniella zealandica zealandica Beier, 1966 — New Zealand
- Tyrannochthoniella zealandica foveauxana Beier, 1967 — New Zealand

- Tyrannochthonius J.C. Chamberlin, 1929

- Tyrannochthonius alabamensis Muchmore, 1996 — Alabama
- Tyrannochthonius aladdinensis Chamberlin, in Muchmore & Chamberlin 1995 — Alabama
- Tyrannochthonius albidus (Beier, 1977) — Galapagos
- Tyrannochthonius amazonicus Mahnert, 1979 — Brazil
- Tyrannochthonius aralu Chamberlin, in Muchmore & Chamberlin 1995 — Alabama
- Tyrannochthonius archeri Chamberlin, in Muchmore & Chamberlin 1995 — Alabama
- Tyrannochthonius assimilis Hong & Tae Heung Ki, 1993 — South Korea
- Tyrannochthonius attenuatus Muchmore, 1996 — Alabama
- Tyrannochthonius avernicolus Chamberlin, in Muchmore & Chamberlin 1995 — Alabama
- Tyrannochthonius bagus Harvey, 1988 — Sumatra
- Tyrannochthonius bahamensis Muchmore, 1984 — Bahamas
- Tyrannochthonius barri Muchmore, 1996 — Alabama
- Tyrannochthonius beieri Morikawa, 1963 — New Guinea, Solomons
- Tyrannochthonius binoculatus Muchmore, 1996 — Alabama
- Tyrannochthonius bispinosus (Beier, 1974) — India
- Tyrannochthonius brasiliensis Mahnert, 1979 — Brazil
- Tyrannochthonius brevimanus Beier, 1935 — central Africa
- Tyrannochthonius brooksi Harvey, 1991 — western Australia
- Tyrannochthonius butleri Harvey, 1991 — western Australia
- Tyrannochthonius caecatus (Beier, 1976) — New Zealand
- Tyrannochthonius callidus Hoff, 1959 — Jamaica
- Tyrannochthonius cavernicola (Beier, 1976) — Lord Howe Island
- Tyrannochthonius cavicola (Beier, 1967) — Australia
- Tyrannochthonius centralis Beier, 1931 — Costa Rica, Ecuador
- Tyrannochthonius chamarro J.C. Chamberlin, 1947 — Caroline Islands
- Tyrannochthonius chamberlini Muchmore, 1996 — Alabama
- Tyrannochthonius charon Muchmore, 1996 — Alabama
- Tyrannochthonius chelatus Murthy & Ananthakrishnan, 1977 — India
- Tyrannochthonius confusus Mahnert, 1986 — Kenya
- Tyrannochthonius contractus (Tullgren, 1907) — Africa
- Tyrannochthonius convivus Beier, 1974 — India
- Tyrannochthonius curazavius Wagenaar-Hummelinck, 1948 — Curacao
- Tyrannochthonius densedentatus (Beier, 1967) — New Zealand
- Tyrannochthonius diabolus Muchmore, 1996 — Alabama
- Tyrannochthonius ecuadoricus (Beier, 1977) — Ecuador, Peru
- Tyrannochthonius elegans Beier, 1944 — central Africa
- Tyrannochthonius erebicus Muchmore, 1996 — Alabama
- Tyrannochthonius felix Muchmore, 1996 — Alabama
- Tyrannochthonius ferox Mahnert, 1978 — Republic of Congo
- Tyrannochthonius fiskei Muchmore, 1996 — Tennessee
- Tyrannochthonius floridensis Malcolm & Muchmore, 1985 — Florida
- Tyrannochthonius gezei Vachon, 1941 — Cameroon
- Tyrannochthonius gigas Beier, 1954 — Venezuela
- Tyrannochthonius gnomus Muchmore, 1996 — Alabama
- Tyrannochthonius gomyi Mahnert, 1975 — Reunion
- Tyrannochthonius grimmeti J.C. Chamberlin, 1929 — New Zealand
- Tyrannochthonius guadeloupensis Vitali-di Castri, 1984 — Guadeloupe
- Tyrannochthonius halopotamus Muchmore, 1996 — Alabama
- Tyrannochthonius helenae (Beier, 1977) — St. Helena
- Tyrannochthonius heterodentatus Beier, 1930 — India
- Tyrannochthonius horridus (Beier, 1976) — New Zealand
- Tyrannochthonius hypogeus Muchmore, 1996 — Kentucky
- Tyrannochthonius imitatus Hoff, 1959 — Jamaica, Dominican Republic
- Tyrannochthonius infernalis Muchmore, 1996 — Alabama
- Tyrannochthonius innominatus Muchmore, 1996 — Florida
- Tyrannochthonius innoxius Hoff, 1959 — Jamaica
- Tyrannochthonius insulae Hoff, 1946 — Trinidad
- Tyrannochthonius intermedius Muchmore, 1986 — Mexico
- Tyrannochthonius irmleri Mahnert, 1979 — Brazil
- Tyrannochthonius japonicus (Ellingsen, 1907) — Japan, Taiwan

- Tyrannochthonius japonicus japonicus (Ellingsen, 1907) — Japan, Taiwan
- Tyrannochthonius japonicus dogoensis Morikawa, 1954 — Japan

- Tyrannochthonius jonesi Chamberlin, in Muchmore & Chamberlin 1995 — Alabama
- Tyrannochthonius kermadecensis (Beier, 1976) — New Zealand
- Tyrannochthonius krakatau Harvey, 1988 — Indonesia
- Tyrannochthonius laevis Beier, 1966 — Australia
- Tyrannochthonius luxtoni (Beier, 1967) — New Zealand
- Tyrannochthonius mahunkai Mahnert, 1978 — Republic of Congo
- Tyrannochthonius meneghettii (Caporiacco, 1949) — central Africa
- Tyrannochthonius meruensis Beier, 1962 — Eastern Africa
- Tyrannochthonius migrans Mahnert, 1979 — Brazil
- Tyrannochthonius minor Mahnert, 1979 — Brazil
- Tyrannochthonius monodi Vachon, 1941 — Cameroon
- Tyrannochthonius nanus (Beier, 1966) — New Guinea
- Tyrannochthonius nergal Chamberlin, in Muchmore & Chamberlin 1995 — Alabama
- Tyrannochthonius noaensis Moyle, 1989 — New Zealand
- Tyrannochthonius norfolkensis (Beier, 1976) — Norfolk Islands
- Tyrannochthonius oahuanus Muchmore, 2000 — Hawaii, Oahu, Koolau Range, Puu Konahuanui, Pacific Islands
- Tyrannochthonius orpheus Muchmore, 1996 — Alabama
- Tyrannochthonius osiris Chamberlin, in Muchmore & Chamberlin 1995 — Alabama
- Tyrannochthonius ovatus Vitali-di Castro, 1984 — Martinique
- Tyrannochthonius pachythorax Redikorzev, 1938 — Vietnam
- Tyrannochthonius palauanus Beier, 1957 — Caroline Islands
- Tyrannochthonius pallidus Muchmore, 1973 — Mexico
- Tyrannochthonius parvus Chamberlin, in Muchmore & Chamberlin 1995 — Alabama
- Tyrannochthonius pecki Muchmore, 1996 — Alabama
- Tyrannochthonius perpusillus Beier, 1951 — Vietnam
- Tyrannochthonius philippinus (Beier, 1966) — Philippines
- Tyrannochthonius pholeter Muchmore, 1996 — Alabama
- Tyrannochthonius pluto Chamberlin, in Muchmore & Chamberlin 1995 — Alabama
- Tyrannochthonius procerus Mahnert, 1978 — Republic of Congo
- Tyrannochthonius proximus Hoff, 1959 — Jamaica, Dominican Republic
- Tyrannochthonius pugnax Mahnert, 1978 — Republic of Congo
- Tyrannochthonius pupukeanus Muchmore, 1983 — Hawaii
- Tyrannochthonius pusillimus Beier, 1951 — Vietnam
- Tyrannochthonius pusillus Beier, 1955 — Peru
- Tyrannochthonius queenslandicus (Beier, 1969) — Australia
- Tyrannochthonius rahmi Beier, 1976 — Nepal, Bhutan
- Tyrannochthonius rex Harvey, 1989 — Australia
- Tyrannochthonius riberai Mahnert, 1984 — Peru
- Tyrannochthonius robustus Beier, 1951 — Vietnam
- Tyrannochthonius rotundimanus Mahnert, 1985 — Brazil
- Tyrannochthonius satan Muchmore, 1996 — Alabama
- Tyrannochthonius semidentatus (Redikorzev, 1924) — Kenya
- Tyrannochthonius semihorridus (Beier, 1969) — Australia
- Tyrannochthonius setiger Mahnert, 1997 — Tenerife, Cueva del Sobrado, Canary Islands
- Tyrannochthonius sheltae Muchmore, 1996 — Alabama
- Tyrannochthonius similidentatus Sato, 1984 — Japan
- Tyrannochthonius simillimus Beier, 1951 — Cambodia
- Tyrannochthonius simulans Mahnert, 1986 — Kenya
- Tyrannochthonius skeletonis Muchmore, 1996 — Alabama
- Tyrannochthonius sokolovi (Redikorzev, 1924) — central Africa
- Tyrannochthonius sparsedentatus Beier, 1959 — Democratic Republic of Congo
- Tyrannochthonius spinatus Hong, in Yong Hong, Tae Heung Kim & Won Koo Le 1996 — South Korea
- Tyrannochthonius steevesi Muchmore, 1996 — Tennessee
- Tyrannochthonius stonei Muchmore, 1989 — Hawaii
- Tyrannochthonius strinatii (Beier, 1974) — Guatemala
- Tyrannochthonius stygius Muchmore, 1996 — Alabama
- Tyrannochthonius superstes Mahnert, 1986 — Canary Islands
- Tyrannochthonius suppressalis Hong, in Yong Hong, Tae Heung Kim & Won Koo Le 1996 — South Korea
- Tyrannochthonius swiftae Muchmore, 1993 — Hawaii
- Tyrannochthonius tartarus Muchmore, 1996 — Alabama
- Tyrannochthonius tekauriensis Moyle, 1989 — New Zealand
- Tyrannochthonius tenuis Chamberlin, in Muchmore & Chamberlin 1995 — Alabama
- Tyrannochthonius terribilis (With, 1906) — southeast Asia

- Tyrannochthonius terribilis terribilis (With, 1906) — southeast Asia
- Tyrannochthonius terribilis malaccensis Beier, 1952 — Malaysia

- Tyrannochthonius tlilapanensis Muchmore, 1986 — Mexico
- Tyrannochthonius torodei Muchmore, 1996 — Alabama
- Tyrannochthonius troglobius Muchmore, 1969 — Mexico
- Tyrannochthonius troglodytes Muchmore, 1986 — Texas
- Tyrannochthonius troglophilus (Beier, 1968) — New Caledonia
- Tyrannochthonius vampirorum Muchmore, 1986 — Mexico
- Tyrannochthonius volcancillo Muchmore, 1986 — Mexico
- Tyrannochthonius volcanus Muchmore, 1977 — Mexico
- Tyrannochthonius wittei Beier, 1955
- Tyrannochthonius wlassicsi (Daday, 1897) — New Guinea
- Tyrannochthonius zicsii Mahnert, 1978 — Republic of Congo
- Tyrannochthonius zonatus (Beier, 1964) — New Caledonia

- Vulcanochthonius Muchmore, 2000

- Vulcanochthonius aa Muchmore, 2000 — Hawaii, Manuka Natural Area Reserve, Visor Cave, Pacific Islands
- Vulcanochthonius howarthi (Muchmore, 1979) — Hawaii
- Vulcanochthonius pohakuloae Muchmore, 2000 — Hawaii, Mauna Kea, Pohakuloa Training Area, Bobcat Trail, Pacific Islands
