= A. cavicola =

A. cavicola may refer to:

- Abacetus cavicola, a ground beetle
- Aplastodiscus cavicola, a frog found in Brazil
- Austrochthonius cavicola, a pseudoscorpion found in Australia
