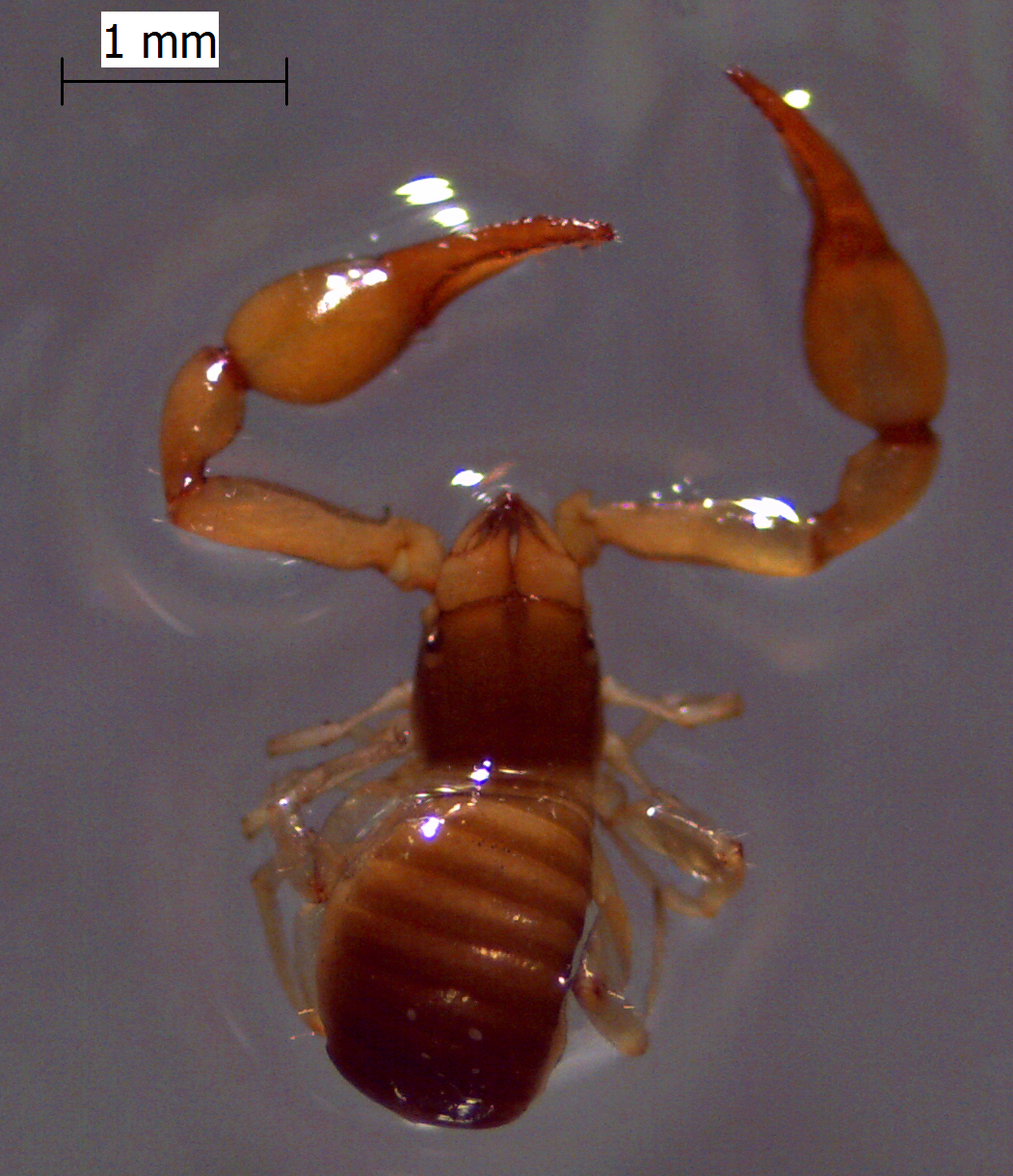
- Pseudoscorpion Chthonius from W Serbia

Scientific classification
- Domain: Eukaryota
- Kingdom: Animalia
- Phylum: Arthropoda
- Subphylum: Chelicerata
- Class: Arachnida
- Order: Pseudoscorpiones
- Suborder: Heterosphyronida
- Superfamily: Chthonioidea

Families
- Pseudotyrannochthoniidae; Chthoniidae

= Chthonioidea =

Superfamily of pseudoscorpions

The Chthonioidea are a superfamily of pseudoscorpions, representing the earliest diverging and most primitive living pseudoscorpions. The superfamily contains two families.

- Pseudotyrannochthoniidae — worldwide (c. 5 genera, 50 species)
- Chthoniidae — worldwide ( 40 + genera, 600+ species)

Some authors consider the genus Lechytia to be in its own family Lechytiidae, rather than to reside in Chthoniidae.
