= Pseudotyrannochthonius gigas =

Scientific classification
- Kingdom: Animalia
- Phylum: Arthropoda
- Subphylum: Chelicerata
- Class: Arachnida
- Order: Pseudoscorpiones
- Family: Pseudotyrannochthoniidae
- Genus: Pseudotyrannochthonius
- Species: P. gigas

Binomial name
- Pseudotyrannochthonius gigas Beier, 1969

Species of pseudoscorpion

Pseudotyrannochthonius gigas is a species of pseudoscorpion in the Pseudotyrannochthoniidae family. It is endemic to Australia. It was described in 1969 by Austrian arachnologist Max Beier.

== Distribution and habitat ==
The species occurs in the Western District of Victoria. The type locality is Harman One Cave, Byaduk.

== Behaviour ==
The pseudoscorpions are cave-dwelling terrestrial predators.
