= Pseudotyrannochthonius hamiltonsmithi =

Scientific classification
- Kingdom: Animalia
- Phylum: Arthropoda
- Subphylum: Chelicerata
- Class: Arachnida
- Order: Pseudoscorpiones
- Family: Pseudotyrannochthoniidae
- Genus: Pseudotyrannochthonius
- Species: P. hamiltonsmithi

Binomial name
- Pseudotyrannochthonius hamiltonsmithi Beier, 1968

Species of pseudoscorpion

Pseudotyrannochthonius hamiltonsmithi is a species of pseudoscorpion in the Pseudotyrannochthoniidae family. It is endemic to Australia. It was described in 1968 by Austrian arachnologist Max Beier.

== Description ==
The body length is 1.7–2 mm. The colour is mainly olive-brown, with the chelicerae and pedipalps pale reddish-brown.

== Distribution and habitat ==
The species occurs in the Western District of Victoria. The type locality is Mount Widderin Cave, Skipton, 166 km west of Melbourne.

== Behaviour ==
The pseudoscorpions are cave-dwelling, terrestrial predators.
