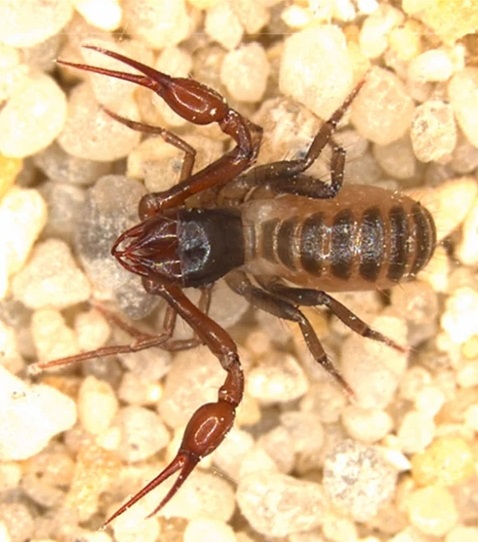

Scientific classification
- Kingdom: Animalia
- Phylum: Arthropoda
- Subphylum: Chelicerata
- Class: Arachnida
- Order: Pseudoscorpiones
- Family: Pseudotyrannochthoniidae
- Genus: Pseudotyrannochthonius
- Species: P. giganteus

Binomial name
- Pseudotyrannochthonius giganteus Beier, 1971

= Pseudotyrannochthonius giganteus =

Species of pseudoscorpion

Pseudotyrannochthonius giganteus is a species of pseudoscorpion in the Pseudotyrannochthoniidae family. It is endemic to Australia. It was described in 1971 by Austrian arachnologist Max Beier.

== Description ==
The body length of the female holotype is 3 mm; that of the paratype males is 2.2–2.5 mm.

== Distribution and habitat ==
The species occurs in south-west Western Australia. The type locality is Calgardup Cave, near Augusta in the Leeuwin-Naturaliste National Park. The type specimens were collected from the final chamber on roots hanging from the cave ceiling.

== Behaviour ==
The pseudoscorpions are cave-dwelling, terrestrial predators.
