= Pseudotyrannochthonius australiensis =

Scientific classification
- Kingdom: Animalia
- Phylum: Arthropoda
- Subphylum: Chelicerata
- Class: Arachnida
- Order: Pseudoscorpiones
- Family: Pseudotyrannochthoniidae
- Genus: Pseudotyrannochthonius
- Species: P. australiensis

Binomial name
- Pseudotyrannochthonius australiensis Beier, 1966

Species of pseudoscorpion

Pseudotyrannochthonius australiensis is a species of pseudoscorpion in the Pseudotyrannochthoniidae family. It is endemic to Australia. It was described in 1966 by Austrian arachnologist Max Beier.

== Distribution and habitat ==
The species occurs in eastern New South Wales. The type locality is Edith, some 11 km south-east of Oberon.

== Behaviour ==
The pseudoscorpions are terrestrial predators that inhabit plant litter.
