= Pseudotyrannochthonius queenslandicus =

Scientific classification
- Kingdom: Animalia
- Phylum: Arthropoda
- Subphylum: Chelicerata
- Class: Arachnida
- Order: Pseudoscorpiones
- Family: Pseudotyrannochthoniidae
- Genus: Pseudotyrannochthonius
- Species: P. queenslandicus

Binomial name
- Pseudotyrannochthonius queenslandicus Beier, 1969

Species of pseudoscorpion

Pseudotyrannochthonius queenslandicus is a species of pseudoscorpion in the Pseudotyrannochthoniidae family. It is endemic to Australia. It was described in 1969 by Austrian arachnologist Max Beier.

== Distribution and habitat ==
The species occurs in south-eastern Queensland. The type locality is closed forest in the Joalah section of the Tamborine National Park, where it was found in plant litter.

== Behaviour ==
The pseudoscorpions are terrestrial predators.
