= Pseudotyrannochthonius eberhardi =

Scientific classification
- Kingdom: Animalia
- Phylum: Arthropoda
- Subphylum: Chelicerata
- Class: Arachnida
- Order: Pseudoscorpiones
- Family: Pseudotyrannochthoniidae
- Genus: Pseudotyrannochthonius
- Species: P. eberhardi

Binomial name
- Pseudotyrannochthonius eberhardi Harms & Harvey, 2013

Species of pseudoscorpion

Pseudotyrannochthonius eberhardi is a species of pseudoscorpion in the Pseudotyrannochthoniidae family. It is endemic to Australia. It was described in 1971 by arachnologists Danilo Harms and Mark Harvey. The specific epithet eberhardi honours Stefan Eberhard, who collected the holotype, for contributions to Australian karst research.

== Description ==
The body length of the female holotype is 3.58 mm. The colour of the cephalothorax, pedipalps and legs is orange-brown, the chelicerae darker, and the soft body parts pale yellow. Eyes are totally absent.

== Distribution and habitat ==
The species occurs in north-eastern New South Wales. The type locality is the deep zone of Rolys Cave (SC-9), in the Stockyard Creek karst, in The Castles Nature Reserve, about 60 km north-west of Kempsey.

== Behaviour ==
The pseudoscorpions are cave-dwelling, terrestrial predators.
