= Pseudotyrannochthonius leichhardti =

Scientific classification
- Kingdom: Animalia
- Phylum: Arthropoda
- Subphylum: Chelicerata
- Class: Arachnida
- Order: Pseudoscorpiones
- Family: Pseudotyrannochthoniidae
- Genus: Pseudotyrannochthonius
- Species: P. leichhardti

Binomial name
- Pseudotyrannochthonius leichhardti Harms, 2013

Species of pseudoscorpion

Pseudotyrannochthonius leichhardti is a species of pseudoscorpion in the Pseudotyrannochthoniidae family. It is endemic to Australia. It was described in 2013 by German arachnologist Danilo Harms. The specific epithet leichhardti honours German explorer of northern Australia Ludwig Leichhardt (1813–c.1848) for his scientific legacy and contributions to natural history.

== Description ==
The body length of the female holotype is 2.40 mm; that of a male paratype is 1.80 mm. The colour of the cephalothorax is brown, the pedipalps, chelicerae and legs light brown, and the soft body parts pale yellow.

== Distribution and habitat ==
The species occurs in north-eastern New South Wales. The type locality is tall sclerophyll forest in elevated terrain along Siding Spring Road, 0.9 km from Siding Spring Observatory, in the Warrumbungle National Park.

== Behaviour ==
The pseudoscorpions are terrestrial predators.
