= Tyrannochthonius norfolkensis =

Scientific classification
- Kingdom: Animalia
- Phylum: Arthropoda
- Subphylum: Chelicerata
- Class: Arachnida
- Order: Pseudoscorpiones
- Family: Chthoniidae
- Genus: Tyrannochthonius
- Species: T. norfolkensis

Binomial name
- Tyrannochthonius norfolkensis (Beier, 1976)

Synonyms
- Paraliochthonius norfolkensis Beier, 1976

Species of pseudoscorpion

Tyrannochthonius norfolkensis is a species of pseudoscorpion in the Chthoniidae family. It was described in 1976 by Austrian arachnologist Max Beier.

== Description ==
The body length of males is 1.2 mm; that of females is 1.3-1.55 mm. The colour is brown.

== Distribution and habitat ==
The species occurs in New Zealand as well as on Norfolk Island, an Australian territory in the south-west Pacific Ocean, where it inhabits plant litter. The type locality is Mount Pitt on Norfolk Island.

== Behaviour ==
The arachnids are terrestrial predators.
