= Austrochthonius muchmorei =

Scientific classification
- Kingdom: Animalia
- Phylum: Arthropoda
- Subphylum: Chelicerata
- Class: Arachnida
- Order: Pseudoscorpiones
- Family: Chthoniidae
- Genus: Austrochthonius
- Species: A. muchmorei

Binomial name
- Austrochthonius muchmorei Harvey & Mould, 2006

Synonyms
- Chthonius caecus Tullgren, 1909; Sathrochthonius tullgreni Chamberlin, 1962

Species of pseudoscorpion

Austrochthonius muchmorei is a species of pseudoscorpion in the Chthoniidae family. It is endemic to Australia. It was described in 2006 by Australian arachnologists Mark Harvey and Lee Mould. The specific epithet muchmorei honours William B. Muchmore for his contributions to pseudoscorpion systematics.

== Distribution and habitat ==
The species occurs in south-west Western Australia. The type locality is Brunswick Junction, some 160 km south of Perth.
