= Tyrannochthonius souchomalus =

Scientific classification
- Kingdom: Animalia
- Phylum: Arthropoda
- Subphylum: Chelicerata
- Class: Arachnida
- Order: Pseudoscorpiones
- Family: Chthoniidae
- Genus: Tyrannochthonius
- Species: T. souchomalus

Binomial name
- Tyrannochthonius souchomalus Edward & Harvey, 2008

Species of pseudoscorpion

Tyrannochthonius souchomalus is a species of pseudoscorpion in the Chthoniidae family. It is endemic to Australia. It was described in 2008 by Australian arachnologists Karen Edward and Mark Harvey.

== Distribution and habitat ==
The species occurs in the Murchison bioregion of Mid West Western Australia. The type locality is a borehole on Austin Downs Station.

== Behaviour ==
The arachnids are cave-dwelling, terrestrial predators.
