= Tyrannochthonius kermadecensis =

Scientific classification
- Kingdom: Animalia
- Phylum: Arthropoda
- Subphylum: Chelicerata
- Class: Arachnida
- Order: Pseudoscorpiones
- Family: Chthoniidae
- Genus: Tyrannochthonius
- Species: T. kermadecensis

Binomial name
- Tyrannochthonius kermadecensis (Beier, 1976)

Synonyms
- Paraliochthonius kermadecensis Beier, 1976

Species of pseudoscorpion

Tyrannochthonius kermadecensis is a species of pseudoscorpion in the Chthoniidae family. It was described in 1976 by Austrian arachnologist Max Beier.

== Description ==
The body length of the female specimens is 1.05-1.3 mm. The colouration is a greenish carapace, amber chela and chelicerae, and pale brownish or orange abdomen.

== Distribution and habitat ==
The species has been recorded from the subtropical Kermadec Islands of New Zealand, as well as from Lord Howe Island, an Australian territory in the Tasman Sea. The type locality is Meyers Island, an islet off Raoul Island in the Kermadecs, where the holotype female was collected from the deserted nest of a common blackbird. The paratype female from Lord Howe was found on foliage.

== Behaviour ==
The arachnids are terrestrial predators.
