= Pseudotyrannochthonius solitarius =

Scientific classification
- Kingdom: Animalia
- Phylum: Arthropoda
- Subphylum: Chelicerata
- Class: Arachnida
- Order: Pseudoscorpiones
- Family: Pseudotyrannochthoniidae
- Genus: Pseudotyrannochthonius
- Species: P. solitarius

Binomial name
- Pseudotyrannochthonius solitarius (Hoff, 1951)

Synonyms
- Tubbichthonius solitarius Hoff, 1951

Species of pseudoscorpion

Pseudotyrannochthonius solitarius is a species of pseudoscorpion in the Pseudotyrannochthoniidae family. It is endemic to Australia. It was described in 1951 by American arachnologist Clarence Clayton Hoff.

== Distribution and habitat ==
The species occurs in the Australian Capital Territory, New South Wales, Tasmania, Victoria and Western Australia. The type locality is Mount Slide in Kinglake National Park north of Melbourne. It inhabits plant litter.

== Behaviour ==
The pseudoscorpions are terrestrial predators.
