= Sathrochthonius insulanus =

Scientific classification
- Kingdom: Animalia
- Phylum: Arthropoda
- Subphylum: Chelicerata
- Class: Arachnida
- Order: Pseudoscorpiones
- Family: Chthoniidae
- Genus: Sathrochthonius
- Species: S. insulanus

Binomial name
- Sathrochthonius insulanus Beier, 1976

Species of pseudoscorpion

Sathrochthonius insulanus is a species of pseudoscorpion in the Chthoniidae family. It is endemic to Australia. It was described in 1976 by Austrian arachnologist Max Beier.

== Description ==
The body length is 1.0-1.2 mm. The colour is pale yellowish-brown.

== Distribution and habitat ==
The species occurs on Lord Howe Island, an offshore island of New South Wales in the Tasman Sea. The type locality is plant litter on Lord Howe.

== Behaviour ==
The arachnids are terrestrial predators.
