= Tyrannochthonius cavernicola =

Scientific classification
- Kingdom: Animalia
- Phylum: Arthropoda
- Subphylum: Chelicerata
- Class: Arachnida
- Order: Pseudoscorpiones
- Family: Chthoniidae
- Genus: Tyrannochthonius
- Species: T. cavernicola

Binomial name
- Tyrannochthonius cavernicola (Beier, 1976)

Synonyms
- Paraliochthonius (Pholeochthonius) cavernicola Beier, 1976

Species of pseudoscorpion

Tyrannochthonius cavernicola is a species of pseudoscorpion in the Chthoniidae family. It is endemic to Australia. It was described in 1976 by Austrian arachnologist Max Beier.

== Description ==
The male holotype has a body length of 2.5 mm. The colour is pale reddish-brown. Eyes and eye-pigment are completely lacking.

== Distribution and habitat ==
The species occurs only on Lord Howe Island, an offshore island of New South Wales in the Tasman Sea. The type locality is the totally dark zone of a cave at North Bay (Station 3).

== Behaviour ==
The arachnids are cave-dwelling terrestrial predators.
