= Pseudotyrannochthonius typhlus =

Scientific classification
- Kingdom: Animalia
- Phylum: Arthropoda
- Subphylum: Chelicerata
- Class: Arachnida
- Order: Pseudoscorpiones
- Family: Pseudotyrannochthoniidae
- Genus: Pseudotyrannochthonius
- Species: P. typhlus

Binomial name
- Pseudotyrannochthonius typhlus Dartnall, 1970

Species of pseudoscorpion

Pseudotyrannochthonius typhlus is a species of pseudoscorpion in the Pseudotyrannochthoniidae family. It is endemic to Australia. It was described in 1970 by Australian zoologist Alan Dartnall.

== Description ==
The body length of the male holotype is 2.8 mm. Eyes are absent.

== Distribution and habitat ==
The species occurs in northern Tasmania. The type locality is Sennacheribs Passage, Georgies Hall Cave, Mole Creek, some 170 km north-west of Hobart. The holotype was found on moist sand and vegetable debris in a stream passage.

== Behaviour ==
The pseudoscorpions are cave-dwelling, terrestrial predators.
