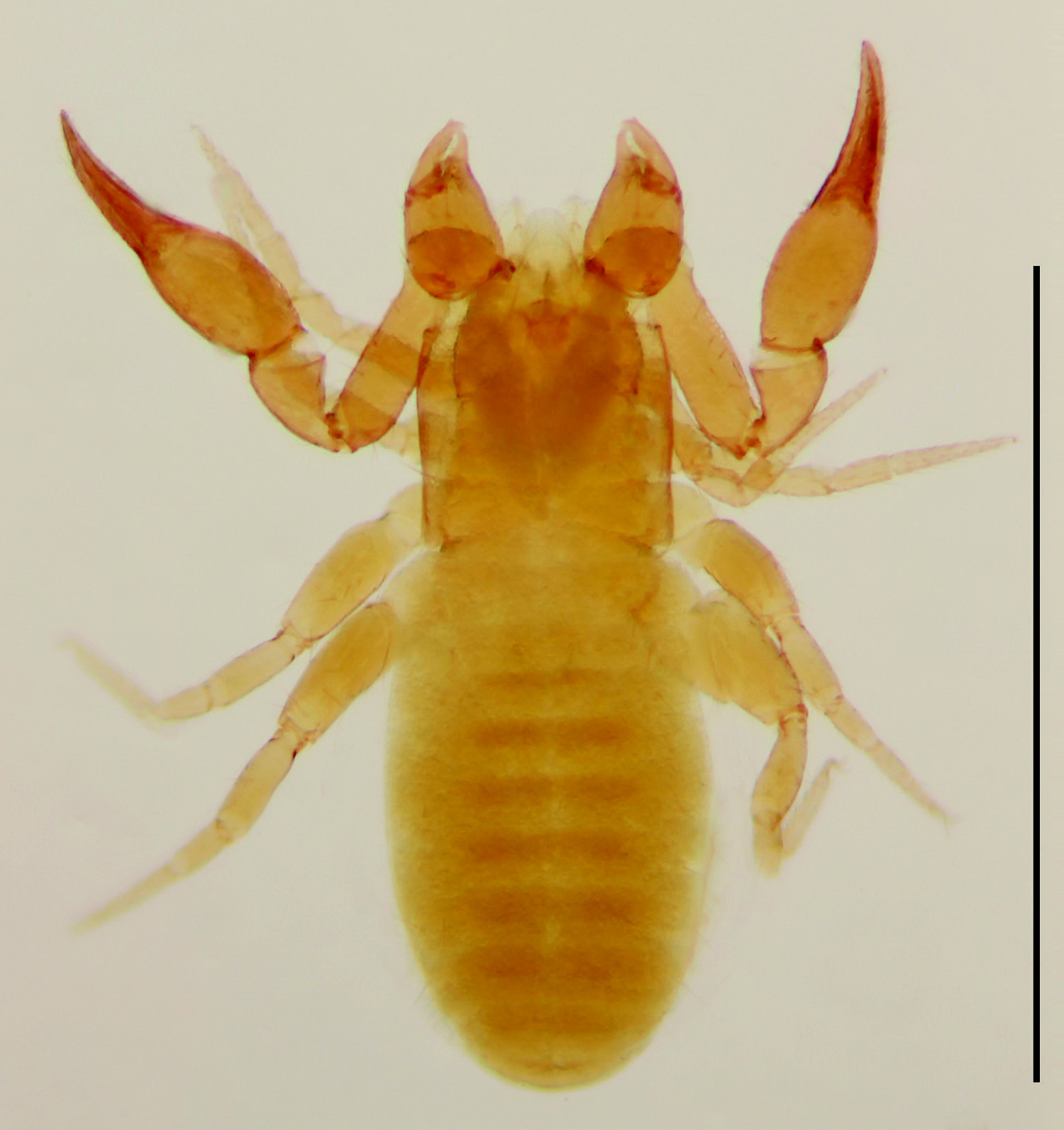
- Lechytia novaezealandiae

Scientific classification
- Domain: Eukaryota
- Kingdom: Animalia
- Phylum: Arthropoda
- Subphylum: Chelicerata
- Class: Arachnida
- Order: Pseudoscorpiones
- Family: Chthoniidae
- Subfamily: Lechytiinae; J.C. Chamberlin, 1929
- Genus: Lechytia; Balzan, 1892

Type species
- Roncus chthoniiformis Balzan, 1887

Species
- See text

Diversity
- 22 species

= Lechytia =

Lechytia Temporal range: Cenomanian–present

Genus of pseudoscorpions

Lechytia is a genus of pseudoscorpions in the subfamily Lechytiinae within the family Chthoniidae. It is the sole genus in its subfamily and contains 22 described species from many parts of the world.

== Species ==
- Lechytia anatolica Beier, 1965 — Turkey
- Lechytia arborea Muchmore, 1975 — Florida, Texas
- Lechytia asiatica Redikorzev, 1938 — Vietnam
- Lechytia cavicola Muchmore, 1973 — Mexico
- Lechytia chilensis Beier, 1964 — Chile
- Lechytia chthoniiformis (Balzan, 1887) — South America
- Lechytia delamarei Vitali-di Castro, 1984 — Guadeloupe
- Lechytia dentata Mahnert, 1978 — Republic of Congo
- † Lechytia finniae Hagen et al., 2025 — fossil: Kachin amber
- Lechytia garambica Beier, 1972 — Democratic Republic of Congo
- Lechytia himalayana Beier, 1974 — Nepal
- Lechytia hoffi Muchmore, 1975 — western USA
- Lechytia indica Murthy & Ananthakrishnan, 1977 — India
- Lechytia kuscheli Beier, 1957 — Juan Fernández Islands
- Lechytia leleupi Beier, 1959 — Democratic Republic of Congo
- Lechytia madrasica Sivaraman, 1980 — India
- Lechytia martiniquensis Vitali-di Castro, 1984 — Martinique
- Lechytia maxima Beier, 1955 — Kenya, Tanzania
- Lechytia natalensis (Tullgren, 1907) — southern Africa
- Lechytia sakagamii Morikawa, 1952 — Caroline Islands
- Lechytia serrulata Beier, 1955 — Democratic Republic of Congo
- Lechytia sini Muchmore, 1975 — Florida, Texas
- † Lechytia tertiaria Schawaller, 1980 — fossil: Dominican amber
- Lechytia trinitatis Beier, 1970
