= Pseudotyrannochthonius tasmanicus =

Scientific classification
- Kingdom: Animalia
- Phylum: Arthropoda
- Subphylum: Chelicerata
- Class: Arachnida
- Order: Pseudoscorpiones
- Family: Pseudotyrannochthoniidae
- Genus: Pseudotyrannochthonius
- Species: P. tasmanicus

Binomial name
- Pseudotyrannochthonius tasmanicus Dartnall, 1970

Species of pseudoscorpion

Pseudotyrannochthonius tasmanicus is a species of pseudoscorpion in the Pseudotyrannochthoniidae family. It is endemic to Australia. It was described in 1970 by Australian zoologist Alan Dartnall.

== Description ==
The body length of the male holotype is 3.0 mm. It is light brown in colour, with the chelicerae and pedipalps darker than the rest of the body. Eyes are absent.

== Distribution and habitat ==
The species occurs in southern Tasmania. The type locality is King George V Cave in the Hastings Caves State Reserve, some 100 km south of Hobart, with the holotype found about 100 m inside the cave, in a stream passage amongst organic debris.

== Behaviour ==
The pseudoscorpions are cave-dwelling, terrestrial predators.
