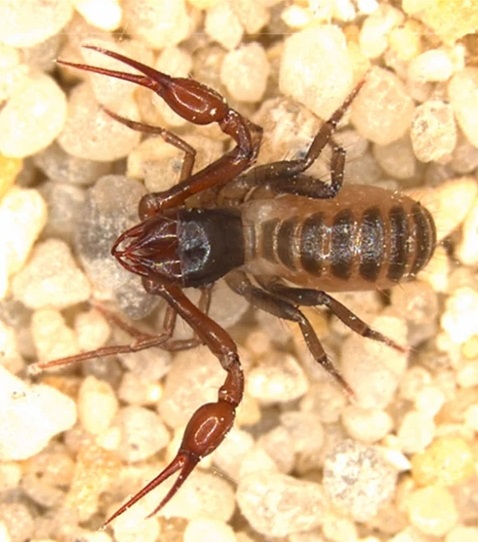
- Pseudotyrannochthonius giganteus

Scientific classification
- Kingdom: Animalia
- Phylum: Arthropoda
- Subphylum: Chelicerata
- Class: Arachnida
- Order: Pseudoscorpiones
- Family: Pseudotyrannochthoniidae
- Genus: Pseudotyrannochthonius; Beier, 1930

Type species
- Chthonius silvestrii Ellingsen, 1905

Synonyms
- Tubbichthonius Hoff, 1951; Spelaeochthonius Morikawa, 1954

= Pseudotyrannochthonius =

Genus of pseudoscorpions

Pseudotyrannochthonius is a genus of pseudoscorpions in the family Pseudotyrannochthoniidae. It was described in 1930 by Austrian arachnologist Max Beier.

== Species ==
As of October 2023, the World Pseudoscorpiones Catalog accepted the following 18 species:

- P. australiensis Beier, 1966
- P. bornemisszai Beier, 1966
- P. eberhardi Harms and Harvey, 2013
- P. giganteus Beier, 1971
- P. gigas Beier, 1969
- P. gracilis Benedict and Malcolm, 1970
- P. hamiltonsmithi Beier, 1968
- P. incognitus (Schuster, 1966)
- P. jonesi (Chamberlin, 1962)
- P. leichhardti Harms, 2013
- P. octospinosus Beier, 1930
- P. queenslandicus Beier, 1969
- P. rossi Beier, 1964
- P. silvestrii (Ellingsen, 1905)
- P. solitarius (Hoff, 1951)
- P. tasmanicus Dartnall, 1970
- P. typhlus Dartnall, 1970
- P. utahensis Muchmore, 1967
