= Lagynochthonius australicus =

Scientific classification
- Kingdom: Animalia
- Phylum: Arthropoda
- Subphylum: Chelicerata
- Class: Arachnida
- Order: Pseudoscorpiones
- Family: Chthoniidae
- Genus: Lagynochthonius
- Species: L. australicus

Binomial name
- Lagynochthonius australicus (Beier, 1966)

Synonyms
- Tyrannochthonius (Lagynochthonius) australicus Beier, 1966

Species of pseudoscorpion

Lagynochthonius australicus is a species of pseudoscorpion in the Chthoniidae family. It is endemic to Australia. It was described in 1966 by Austrian arachnologist Max Beier.

== Distribution and habitat ==
The species occurs in south-west Western Australia, where it inhabits plant litter in tall forest habitats. The type locality is Denmark, some 420 km south-south-east of Perth.

== Behaviour ==
The arachnids are terrestrial predators.
