= Tyrannochthonius queenslandicus =

Scientific classification
- Kingdom: Animalia
- Phylum: Arthropoda
- Subphylum: Chelicerata
- Class: Arachnida
- Order: Pseudoscorpiones
- Family: Chthoniidae
- Genus: Tyrannochthonius
- Species: T. queenslandicus

Binomial name
- Tyrannochthonius queenslandicus (Beier, 1969)

Synonyms
- Morikawia queenslandica Beier, 1969

Species of pseudoscorpion

Tyrannochthonius queenslandicus is a species of pseudoscorpion in the Chthoniidae family. It is endemic to Australia. It was described in 1969 by Austrian arachnologist Max Beier.

== Distribution and habitat ==
The species occurs in south-eastern Queensland, inhabiting plant litter in closed forest habitats. The type locality is Joalah, Tamborine National Park.

== Behaviour ==
The arachnids are terrestrial predators.
