= Austrochthonius strigosus =

Scientific classification
- Kingdom: Animalia
- Phylum: Arthropoda
- Subphylum: Chelicerata
- Class: Arachnida
- Order: Pseudoscorpiones
- Family: Chthoniidae
- Genus: Austrochthonius
- Species: A. strigosus

Binomial name
- Austrochthonius strigosus Harvey & Mould, 2006

Species of pseudoscorpion

Austrochthonius strigosus is a species of pseudoscorpion in the Chthoniidae family. It is endemic to Australia. It was described in 2006 by Australian arachnologists Mark Harvey and Lee Mould. The specific epithet strigosus (Latin: ‘lean’ or ‘thin’) refers to the slender pedipalpal chela.

== Description ==
The holotype male has a body length of 1.184 mm. It lacks eyes. Colouration is generally pale yellow-brown, with the legs paler than the body.

== Distribution and habitat ==
The species occurs in south-west Western Australia. The type locality is a borehole in limestone sediments near Ludlow, some 200 km south of Perth.
