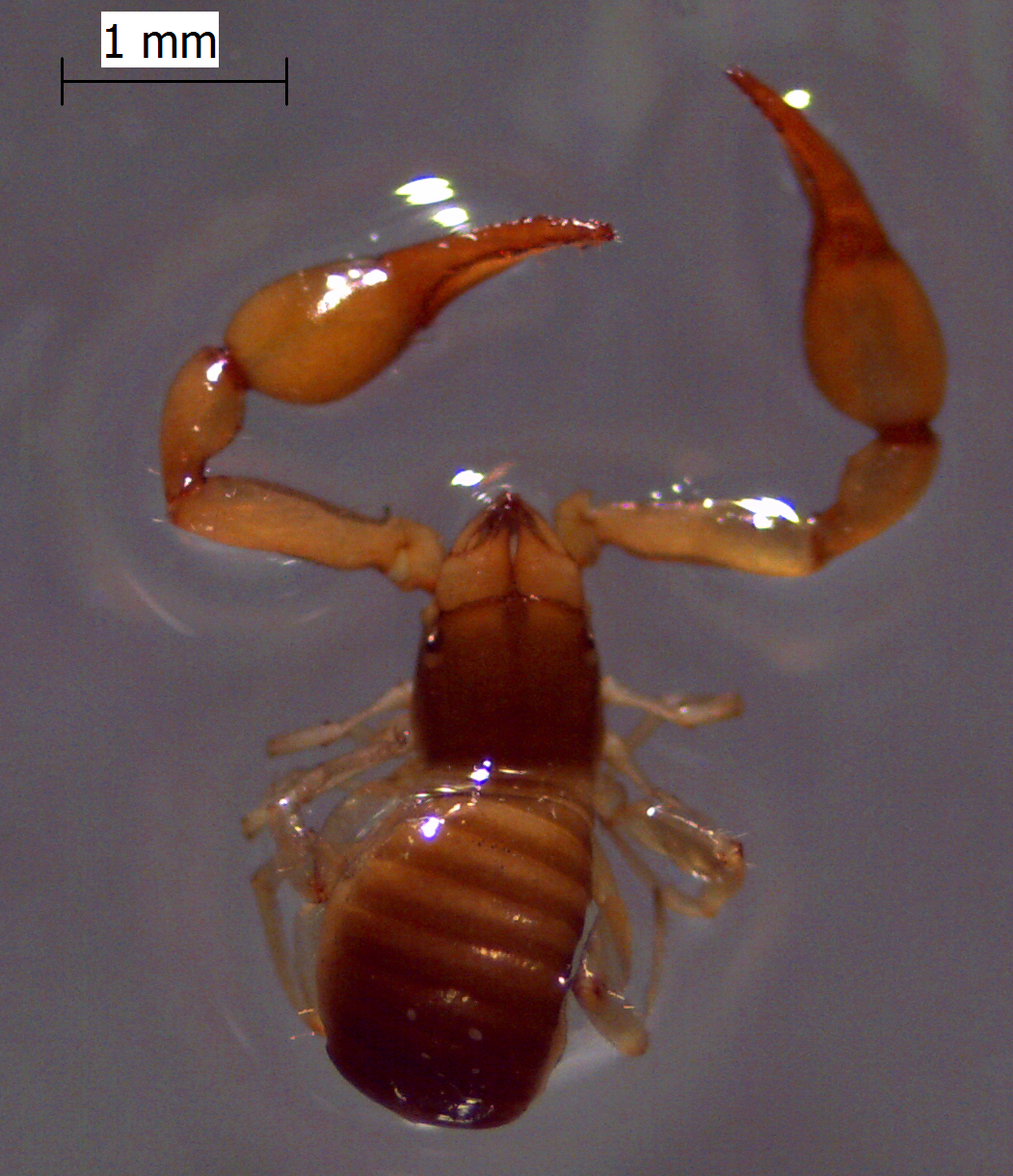
- Chthonius sp., from W Serbia, 2016

Scientific classification
- Kingdom: Animalia
- Phylum: Arthropoda
- Subphylum: Chelicerata
- Class: Arachnida
- Order: Pseudoscorpiones
- Family: Chthoniidae
- Genus: Chthonius; C. L. Koch, 1843

Species
- 121, see text

= Chthonius (arachnid) =

Chthonius Temporal range: 47.8–0 Ma

Genus of pseudoscorpions

Chthonius is a genus of pseudoscorpions, first described by Carl Ludwig Koch in 1843.

There are more than 100 species which are distributed from Europe to Iran, North Africa, Balearic Islands and the USA. There is one cosmopolitan species. There are also fossil species from the Eocene of Poland and the Russian Federation.

== Species ==
As of July 2022, the World Pseudoscorpiones Catalog accepts the following 121 species:

- Chthonius absoloni Beier, 1938 — Bosnia, Croatia
- Chthonius agazzii Beier, 1966 — Italy
- Chthonius alpicola Beier, 1951 — Austria, Croatia, Germany, Italy, Slovenia
- Chthonius apollinis Mahnert, 1978 — Greece
- Chthonius aquasanctae Ćurčić & Rađa, 2011 — Serbia
- Chthonius azerbaidzhanus Schawaller & Dashdamirov, 1988 — Azerbaijan
- Chthonius balazuci Vachon, 1963 — France
- Chthonius bogovinae Ćurčić, 1972 — Serbia
- Chthonius borissketi Ćurčić, Sarbu, Dimitrijević & Ćurčić, 2014 — Romania
- Chthonius campaneti Zaragoza & Vadell, 2013 — Spain
- Chthonius caoduroi Callaini, 1987 — Italy
- Chthonius caprai Gardini, 1977 — Italy
- Chthonius carinthiacus Beier, 1951 — Austria, Czechia, Hungary, Italy, Romania, Slovakia, Slovenia, Switzerland
- Chthonius cavernarum Ellingsen, 1909 — Italy, Romania, Slovenia
- Chthonius cavophilus Hadži, 1939 — Bulgaria
- Chthonius cebenicus Leclerc, 1981 — France
- Chthonius cephalotes (Simon, 1875) — France
- Chthonius chamberlini (Leclerc, 1983) — Algeria, France
- Chthonius comottii Inzaghi, 1987 — Italy
- Chthonius croaticus Ćurčić & Rađa, 2012 — Croatia
- Chthonius cryptus Chamberlin, 1962 — Greece
- Chthonius dacnodes Navás, 1918 — Netherlands, Portugal, Spain
- Chthonius decoui Georgescu & Căpușe, 1994 — Romania
- Chthonius delmastroi Gardini, 2009 — Italy
- Chthonius densedentatus Beier, 1938 — Albania, Bosnia, Croatia, France, Greece, Italy, Slovenia, Switzerland
- Chthonius doderoi Beier, 1930 — France
- Chthonius elongatus Lazzeroni, 1970 — Italy
- Chthonius euganeus Gardini, 1991 — Italy
- Chthonius exarmatus Beier, 1939 — Croatia, Montenegro
- Chthonius gallettii Gardini, 2021 — Italy
- Chthonius gentianae Gardini, 2021 — Italy
- Chthonius gjirokastri Ćurčić, Rađa & Dimitrijević, 2008 — Albania
- Chthonius globocicae Ćurčić, Dimitrijević & Tomić, 2008 — Montenegro
- Chthonius graecus Beier, 1963 — Greece
- Chthonius guglielmii Callaini, 1986 — France, Italy
- Chthonius halberti Kew, 1916 — France, Ireland, Italy, Portugal, UK
- Chthonius herbarii Mahnert, 1980 — Greece
- Chthonius herminii Gardini, 2021 — Italy
- Chthonius heterodactylus (Tömösváry, 1883) — Czechia, Germany, Greece, Hungary, Poland, Romania, Slovakia, Ukraine
- Chthonius heurtaultae (Leclerc, 1981) — France
- Chthonius horridus Beier, 1934 — Italy
- Chthonius hungaricus Mahnert, 1981 — Hungary, Romania, Slovakia
- Chthonius ilvensis Beier, 1963 — France, Italy
- Chthonius imperator Mahnert, 1978 — Greece
- Chthonius inguscioi Gardini, 2021 — Italy
- Chthonius ischnocheles (Hermann, 1804) — Europe, US
- Chthonius ischnocheloides Beier, 1973 — Italy
- Chthonius italicus Beier, 1930 — France, Italy
- Chthonius iugoslavicus Ćurčić, 1972 — Serbia
- Chthonius jonicus Beier, 1931 — Albania, Greece, Israel, Italy, Lebanon, Malta, Portugal, Romania, Spain, Turkey
- Chthonius jugorum Beier, 1952 — Austria, Italy
- Chthonius karamanianus Hadži, 1937 — North Macedonia
- Chthonius kirghisicus Prado, Viana, Milko & Ferreira, 2021 — Kyrgyzstan
- Chthonius kladanjensis Ćurčić, Dimitrijević & Rađa, 2011 — Bosnia
- Chthonius kosovensis Ćurčić, 2011 — Serbia
- Chthonius lagadini Dimitrijević, 2011 — Macedonia
- Chthonius lanai Gardini, 2021 — Italy
- Chthonius lanzai Caporiacco, 1947 — Italy
- Chthonius latidentatus Ćurčić, 1972 — Serbia
- Chthonius leoi (Callaini, 1988) — Italy
- Chthonius lesnik Ćurčić, 1994 — Serbia
- Chthonius lessiniensis Schawaller, 1982 — Italy
- Chthonius ligusticus Beier, 1930 — Italy, Romania
- Chthonius lindbergi Beier, 1956 — Greece
- Chthonius longimanus Ćurčič & Rađa, 2011 — Montenegro
- Chthonius lucifugus Mahnert, 1977 — France, Spain
- Chthonius lupinus Ćurčić, Dimitrijević & Rađa, 2011 — Bosnia
- Chthonius macedonicus Ćurčić, 1972 — North Macedonia
- Chthonius magnificus Beier, 1938 — Bosnia, Croatia
- Chthonius makirina Ćurčić & Rađa, 2012 — Croatia
- Chthonius marciai Gardini, 2021 — Italy
- Chthonius mauritanicus (Callaini, 1988) — Morocco
- Chthonius mayi Heurtault-Rossi, 1968 — France
- Chthonius mazaurici Leclerc, 1981 — France
- Chthonius medeonis Ćurčić, S.B. Ćurčić, N.B. Ćurčić and Ilić, 2011 — Montenegro
- Chthonius microphthalmus Simon, 1879 — France, Italy
- Chthonius minotaurus Henderickx, 1997 — Crete (Greece)
- Chthonius monicae Boghean, 1989 — Romania
- Chthonius motasi Dumitresco & Orghidan, 1964 — Romania
- Chthonius multidentatus Beier, 1963 — Italy
- Chthonius nicolosii Gardini, 2021 — Italy
- Chthonius occultus Beier, 1939 — Bosnia, Croatia
- Chthonius ognjankae Ćurčić, 1997 — North Macedonia
- Chthonius ohridanus Ćurčić, 1997 — North Macedonia
- Chthonius onaei Ćurčić, Dimitrijević, Radja, Ćurčić & Milinčić, 2010 — Croatia
- Chthonius orthodactyloides Beier, 1967 — Turkey
- Chthonius orthodactylus (Leach, 1817) — Europe, Tunisia
- Chthonius pacificus Muchmore, 1968 — US
- Chthonius paganus (Hoff, 1961) — US
- Chthonius pagus Ćurčić & Rađa, 2012 — Croatia
- Chthonius paludis (Chamberlin, 1929) — US
- Chthonius paolettii Beier, 1973 — Italy
- Chthonius persimilis Beier, 1939 — Serbia
- Chthonius petrochilosi Heurtault, 1972 — Greece
- Chthonius ponticoides Mahnert, 1975 — Greece
- Chthonius ponticus Beier, 1965 — Georgia, Turkey
- Chthonius porevidi Ćurčić, Makarov & Lučić, 1998 — Montenegro
- Chthonius pristani Ćurčić, 2011 — Croatia
- Chthonius protobosniacus Ćurčić, Dimitrijević & Rađa, 2011 — Bosnia
- Chthonius prove Ćurčić, Dimitrijević & Makarov, 1997 — Montenegro
- Chthonius pusillus Beier, 1947 — Austria, Hungary, Slovenia
- Chthonius pygmaeus Beier, 1934 — Austria, Croatia, Hungary, Italy, Slovakia, Slovenia, Switzerland
- Chthonius radigost Ćurčić, 1997 — North Macedonia
- Chthonius radjai Ćurčić, 1988 — Croatia
- Chthonius raridentatus Hadži, 1930 — Austria, Croatia, Italy, Slovenia
- Chthonius ressli Beier, 1956 — Austria, Czechia, France, Hungary, Italy, Monaco, Slovakia, Switzerland
- Chthonius rhizon Ćurčić, 2013 — Montenegro
- Chthonius sestasi Mahnert, 1980 — Greece
- Chthonius shelkovnikovi Redikorzev, 1930 — Armenia, Azerbaijan, Georgia, Greece, Iran, Turkey, Turkmenistan
- Chthonius shulovi Beier, 1963 — Israel
- Chthonius stammeri Beier, 1942 — Italy
- Chthonius stevanovici Ćurčić, 1986 — Serbia
- Chthonius strinatii Mahnert, 1975 — Greece
- Chthonius submontanus Beier, 1963 — Austria, Germany, Italy, Romania, Switzerland
- Chthonius subterraneus Beier, 1931 — Bosnia, Croatia, Hungary, Montenegro, Slovakia
- Chthonius tadzhikistanicus Dashdamirov & Schawaller, 1992 — Tajikistan
- Chthonius tenuis L. Koch, 1873 — Algeria, Tunisia, Europe
- Chthonius thessalus Mahnert, 1980 — Greece
- Chthonius torakensis Ćurčić & Rađa, 2010 — Croatia
- Chthonius trebinjensis Beier, 1938 — Bosnia, Croatia
- Chthonius troglobius Hadži, 1937 — North Macedonia
- Chthonius troglodites Redikorzev, 1928 — Bulgaria
- Chthonius tzanoudakisi Mahnert, 1975 — Greece
- Chthonius vodan Ćurčić, 1997 — North Macedonia
- Chthonius youtabae Zamani, Shoushtari, Kahrarian & Nassirkhani, 2020 — Iran
- Chthonius zmaj Ćurčić, 1997 — North Macedonia
