= Pseudotyrannochthonius silvestrii =

Scientific classification
- Domain: Eukaryota
- Kingdom: Animalia
- Phylum: Arthropoda
- Subphylum: Chelicerata
- Class: Arachnida
- Order: Pseudoscorpiones
- Family: Pseudotyrannochthoniidae
- Genus: Pseudotyrannochthonius
- Species: P. silvestrii

Binomial name
- Pseudotyrannochthonius silvestrii (Ellingsen, 1905)

Synonyms
- Chthonius silvestrii Ellingsen, 1905

Species of pseudoscorpion

Pseudotyrannochthonius silvestrii is a species of Chilean pseudoscorpions of the family Pseudotyrannochthoniidae. It was described in 1905 by Edvard Ellingsen, with a type locality of Santiago, Chile.
