= Tyrannochthonius cavicola =

Scientific classification
- Kingdom: Animalia
- Phylum: Arthropoda
- Subphylum: Chelicerata
- Class: Arachnida
- Order: Pseudoscorpiones
- Family: Chthoniidae
- Genus: Tyrannochthonius
- Species: T. cavicola

Binomial name
- Tyrannochthonius cavicola (Beier, 1967)

Synonyms
- Morikawia cavicola Beier, 1967

Species of pseudoscorpion

Tyrannochthonius cavicola is a species of pseudoscorpion in the Chthoniidae family. It is endemic to Australia. It was described in 1967 by Austrian arachnologist Max Beier.

== Distribution and habitat ==
The species occurs in eastern New South Wales. The type locality is The Grill Cave, Bungonia, some 125 km south-west of Sydney.

== Behaviour ==
The arachnids are cave-dwelling, terrestrial predators.
