= Sathrochthonius maoricus =

Scientific classification
- Kingdom: Animalia
- Phylum: Arthropoda
- Subphylum: Chelicerata
- Class: Arachnida
- Order: Pseudoscorpiones
- Family: Chthoniidae
- Genus: Sathrochthonius
- Species: S. maoricus

Binomial name
- Sathrochthonius maoricus Beier, 1976

Species of pseudoscorpion

Sathrochthonius maoricus is a species of pseudoscorpion in the Chthoniidae family. It is endemic to New Zealand. It was described in 1976 by Austrian arachnologist Max Beier.

== Description ==
The body length of males is 1.7-1.8 mm; that of females is 1.8-2.2 mm. The colour is dark brown.

== Distribution and habitat ==
The species occurs in New Zealand. The type locality is Pelorus Bridge in Marlborough, where the habitat is dense mixed forest.

== Behaviour ==
The arachnids are terrestrial predators.
