= Lagynochthonius leemouldi =

Scientific classification
- Kingdom: Animalia
- Phylum: Arthropoda
- Subphylum: Chelicerata
- Class: Arachnida
- Order: Pseudoscorpiones
- Family: Chthoniidae
- Genus: Lagynochthonius
- Species: L. leemouldi

Binomial name
- Lagynochthonius leemouldi Edward & Harvey, 2008

Species of pseudoscorpion

Lagynochthonius leemouldi is a species of pseudoscorpion in the Chthoniidae family. It is endemic to Australia. It was described in 2008 by Australian arachnologists Karen Edward and Mark Harvey.

== Distribution and habitat ==
The species occurs in the Pilbara region of North West Australia. The type locality is a borehole on Yarrie Station, some 170 km south-east of Port Hedland.

== Behaviour ==
The arachnids are cave-dwelling, terrestrial predators.
