= Pseudotyrannochthonius jonesi =

Scientific classification
- Kingdom: Animalia
- Phylum: Arthropoda
- Subphylum: Chelicerata
- Class: Arachnida
- Order: Pseudoscorpiones
- Family: Pseudotyrannochthoniidae
- Genus: Pseudotyrannochthonius
- Species: P. jonesi

Binomial name
- Pseudotyrannochthonius jonesi (Chamberlin, 1962)

Synonyms
- Tubbichthonius jonesi Chamberlin, 1962

Species of pseudoscorpion

Pseudotyrannochthonius jonesi is a species of pseudoscorpion in the Pseudotyrannochthoniidae family. It is endemic to Australia. It was described in 1962 by American arachnologist Joseph Conrad Chamberlin.

== Distribution and habitat ==
The species occurs in eastern New South Wales, where it known only from the Jenolan karst. The type locality is given as ‘probably in Blue Mountains near Sydney’.

== Behaviour ==
The pseudoscorpions are cave-dwelling, terrestrial predators.
