= Tyrannochthonius laevis =

Scientific classification
- Kingdom: Animalia
- Phylum: Arthropoda
- Subphylum: Chelicerata
- Class: Arachnida
- Order: Pseudoscorpiones
- Family: Chthoniidae
- Genus: Tyrannochthonius
- Species: T. laevis

Binomial name
- Tyrannochthonius laevis Beier, 1966

Species of pseudoscorpion

Tyrannochthonius laevis is a species of pseudoscorpion in the Chthoniidae family. It is endemic to Australia. It was described in 1966 by Austrian arachnologist Max Beier.

== Distribution and habitat ==
The species occurs in the Kimberley region of North West Australia. The type locality is the Kimberley Research Station, Kununurra.

== Behaviour ==
The arachnids are terrestrial predators.
