= Lagynochthonius =

Scientific classification
- Kingdom: Animalia
- Phylum: Arthropoda
- Subphylum: Chelicerata
- Class: Arachnida
- Order: Pseudoscorpiones
- Family: Chthoniidae
- Genus: Lagynochthonius; Beier, 1951

Type species
- Chthonius johni Redikorzev, 1922

Genus of pseudoscorpions

Lagynochthonius is a genus of pseudoscorpions in the family Chthoniidae. It was described in 1951 by Austrian arachnologist Max Beier.

== Species ==
As of October 2023, the World Pseudoscorpiones Catalog accepted the following species:

- Lagynochthonius annamensis (Beier, 1951)
- Lagynochthonius arctus (Beier, 1967)
- Lagynochthonius asema Edward and Harvey, 2008
- Lagynochthonius australicus (Beier, 1966)
- Lagynochthonius bailongtanensis Li, Liu and Shi, 2019
- Lagynochthonius bakeri (Chamberlin, 1929)
- Lagynochthonius brachydigitatus Zhang and Zhang, 2014
- Lagynochthonius brincki (Beier, 1973)
- Lagynochthonius callidus (Hoff, 1959)
- Lagynochthonius cavicola Muchmore, 1991
- Lagynochthonius chamorro (Chamberlin, 1947)
- Lagynochthonius crassus Hou, Gao and Zhang, 2022
- Lagynochthonius curvidigitatus Mahnert, 1997
- Lagynochthonius dybasi (Beier, 1957)
- Lagynochthonius exiguus (Beier, 1952)
- Lagynochthonius fengi Hou, Gao and Zhang, 2022
- Lagynochthonius ferox (Mahnert, 1978)
- Lagynochthonius flavus (Mahnert, 1986)
- Lagynochthonius fragilis Judson, 2007
- Lagynochthonius gigas (Beier, 1954)
- Lagynochthonius guasirih (Mahnert, 1988)
- Lagynochthonius hamatus Harvey, 1988
- Lagynochthonius harveyi Hu and Zhang, in Zhang and Zhang, 2014
- Lagynochthonius himalayensis (Morikawa, 1968)
- Lagynochthonius hygricus Murthy and Ananthakrishnan, 1977
- Lagynochthonius indicus Murthy and Ananthakrishnan, 1977
- Lagynochthonius innoxius (Hoff, 1959)
- Lagynochthonius insulanus Mahnert, 2007
- Lagynochthonius irmleri (Mahnert, 1979)
- Lagynochthonius johni (Redikorzev, 1922)
- Lagynochthonius kapi Harvey, 1988
- Lagynochthonius kenyensis (Mahnert, 1986)
- Lagynochthonius laoxueyanensis Hou, Gao & Zhang, 2022
- Lagynochthonius leemouldi Edward and Harvey, 2008
- Lagynochthonius leptopalpus Hu and Zhang, 2012
- Lagynochthonius lopezi Mahnert, 2011
- Lagynochthonius magnidentatus Hou, Gao and Zhang, 2022
- Lagynochthonius medog Zhang and Zhang, 2014
- Lagynochthonius microdentatus Mahnert, 2011
- Lagynochthonius minimus Hou, Gao and Zhang, 2022
- Lagynochthonius minor (Mahnert, 1979)
- Lagynochthonius mordor Harvey, 1989
- Lagynochthonius nagaminei (Sato, 1983)
- Lagynochthonius niger Hu and Zhang, 2012
- Lagynochthonius novaeguineae (Beier, 1965)
- Lagynochthonius oromii Mahnert, 2011
- Lagynochthonius paucedentatus (Beier, 1955)
- Lagynochthonius polydentatus Edward and Harvey, 2008
- Lagynochthonius ponapensis (Beier, 1957)
- Lagynochthonius proximus (Hoff, 1959)
- Lagynochthonius pugnax (Mahnert, 1978)
- Lagynochthonius retrorsus Hou, Gao and Zhang, 2022
- Lagynochthonius roeweri Chamberlin, 1962
- Lagynochthonius salomonensis (Beier, 1966)
- Lagynochthonius serratus Hou, Gao and Zhang, 2022
- Lagynochthonius sinensis (Beier, 1967)
- Lagynochthonius spinulentus Hou, Gao and Zhang, 2022
- Lagynochthonius subterraneus Mahnert, 2011
- Lagynochthonius tenuimanus Mahnert, 2011
- Lagynochthonius thorntoni Harvey, 1988
- Lagynochthonius tonkinensis (Beier, 1951)
- Lagynochthonius typhlus Muchmore, 1991
- Lagynochthonius xiaolinensis Hou, Gao and Zhang, 2022
- Lagynochthonius xibaiensis Hou, Gao and Zhang, 2022
- Lagynochthonius xinjiaoensis Hou, Gao and Zhang, 2022
- Lagynochthonius yaowangguensis Hou, Gao and Zhang, 2022
- Lagynochthonius zicsii (Mahnert, 1978)
