= Tyrannochthonius rex =

Scientific classification
- Kingdom: Animalia
- Phylum: Arthropoda
- Subphylum: Chelicerata
- Class: Arachnida
- Order: Pseudoscorpiones
- Family: Chthoniidae
- Genus: Tyrannochthonius
- Species: T. rex

Binomial name
- Tyrannochthonius rex Harvey, 1989

Species of pseudoscorpion

Tyrannochthonius rex is a species of pseudoscorpion in the family Chthoniidae. It is endemic to Australia.
