= Austrochthonius australis =

Scientific classification
- Kingdom: Animalia
- Phylum: Arthropoda
- Subphylum: Chelicerata
- Class: Arachnida
- Order: Pseudoscorpiones
- Family: Chthoniidae
- Genus: Austrochthonius
- Species: A. australis

Binomial name
- Austrochthonius australis Hoff, 1951

Species of pseudoscorpion

Austrochthonius australis is a species of pseudoscorpion in the Chthoniidae family. It is endemic to Australia. It was described in 1951 by American arachnologist Clayton Hoff.

== Distribution and habitat ==
The species occurs in both eastern and south-western Australia, inhabiting plant litter. The type locality is Mount Slide in Kinglake National Park, Victoria.

== Behaviour ==
The pseudoscorpions are terrestrial predators.
