= Austrochthonius insularis =

Scientific classification
- Kingdom: Animalia
- Phylum: Arthropoda
- Subphylum: Chelicerata
- Class: Arachnida
- Order: Pseudoscorpiones
- Family: Chthoniidae
- Genus: Austrochthonius
- Species: A. insularis

Binomial name
- Austrochthonius insularis Vitali-di Castri, 1968

Species of pseudoscorpion

Austrochthonius insularis is a species of pseudoscorpions in the family Chthoniidae.

== Distribution ==
The species is endemic to the Crozet Islands in the French Southern and Antarctic Lands.

== Original publication ==
- Vitali-di Castri, 1968 : Austrochthonius insularis, nouvelle espèce de pseudoscorpions de l'archipel des Crozet (Heterosphyronida, Chthoniidae). Bulletin du Muséum National d'Histoire Naturelle, Paris, ser. 2, vol. 40, p. 141-148.
