= Lagynochthonius mordor =

Scientific classification
- Kingdom: Animalia
- Phylum: Arthropoda
- Subphylum: Chelicerata
- Class: Arachnida
- Order: Pseudoscorpiones
- Family: Chthoniidae
- Genus: Lagynochthonius
- Species: L. mordor

Binomial name
- Lagynochthonius mordor Harvey, 1989

Species of pseudoscorpion

Lagynochthonius mordor is a species of pseudoscorpion in the Chthoniidae family. It is endemic to Australia. It was described in 1989 by Australian arachnologist Mark Harvey. The specific epithet mordor refers to the type locality.

== Description ==
The body length of the male holotype is 1.35 mm; that of the female paratype is 1.53 mm. They are pale yellow-brown in colouration.

== Distribution and habitat ==
The species occurs in Far North Queensland. The type locality is Tier Cave, North Mordor Tower, Mount Mulgrave Station, Cape York Peninsula.

== Behaviour ==
The arachnids are cave-dwelling, terrestrial predators.
