= Tyrannochthonius brooksi =

Scientific classification
- Kingdom: Animalia
- Phylum: Arthropoda
- Subphylum: Chelicerata
- Class: Arachnida
- Order: Pseudoscorpiones
- Family: Chthoniidae
- Genus: Tyrannochthonius
- Species: T. brooksi

Binomial name
- Tyrannochthonius brooksi Harvey, 1991

Species of pseudoscorpion

Tyrannochthonius brooksi is a species of pseudoscorpion in the Chthoniidae family. It is endemic to Australia. It was described in 1991 by Australian arachnologist Mark Harvey. The specific epithet brooksi honours Darren Brooks, who collected some of the type specimens.

== Description ==
The body length of the male is 1.34-1.35 mm; that of the female is 1.58-1.60 mm. The colour is light yellow-brown.

== Distribution and habitat ==
The species occurs in the Cape Range of North West Australia. The type locality is Monajee Cave, C-21.

== Behaviour ==
The arachnids are cave-dwelling, terrestrial predators.
