= Austrochthonius cavicola =

Scientific classification
- Kingdom: Animalia
- Phylum: Arthropoda
- Subphylum: Chelicerata
- Class: Arachnida
- Order: Pseudoscorpiones
- Family: Chthoniidae
- Genus: Austrochthonius
- Species: A. cavicola

Binomial name
- Austrochthonius cavicola Beier, 1968

Species of pseudoscorpion

Austrochthonius cavicola is a species of pseudoscorpion in the Chthoniidae family. It is endemic to Australia. It was described in 1968 by Austrian arachnologist Max Beier.

== Description ==
The holotype male has a body length of 1.2 mm. It lacks eyes, and is pale brownish-yellow in colour.

== Distribution and habitat ==
The species occurs in south-eastern South Australia. The type (and only known) locality is Cathedral Cave, Naracoorte Caves National Park.

== Behaviour ==
The pseudoscorpions are cave-dwelling terrestrial predators.
