= Tyrannochthonius butleri =

Scientific classification
- Kingdom: Animalia
- Phylum: Arthropoda
- Subphylum: Chelicerata
- Class: Arachnida
- Order: Pseudoscorpiones
- Family: Chthoniidae
- Genus: Tyrannochthonius
- Species: T. butleri

Binomial name
- Tyrannochthonius butleri Harvey, 1991

Species of pseudoscorpion

Tyrannochthonius butleri is a species of pseudoscorpion in the Chthoniidae family. It is endemic to Australia. It was described in 1991 by Australian arachnologist Mark Harvey. The specific epithet butleri honours naturalist Harry Butler (1930–2015), who provided funding for fieldwork in the Cape Range.

== Description ==
The species lacks eyes. The body length of the male is 1.07 mm; that of the female is 1.22 mm. The colour is very pale yellow.

== Distribution and habitat ==
The species occurs in the Cape Range of North West Australia. The type locality is Cave C-167, where the holotype male was found beneath a rock in the dark zone.

== Behaviour ==
The arachnids are cave-dwelling, terrestrial predators.
