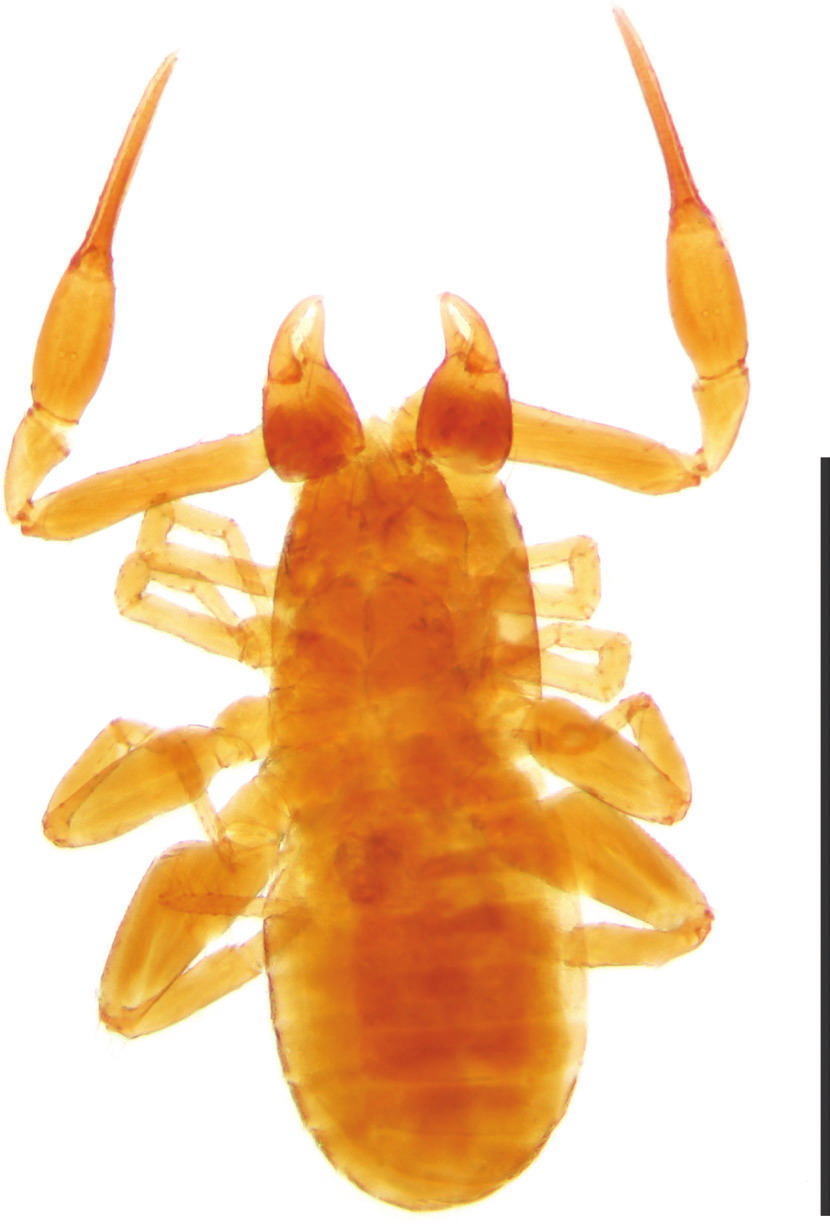
- Tyrannochthonius eua

Scientific classification
- Kingdom: Animalia
- Phylum: Arthropoda
- Subphylum: Chelicerata
- Class: Arachnida
- Order: Pseudoscorpiones
- Family: Chthoniidae
- Genus: Tyrannochthonius; J.C.Chamberlin, 1929

Type species
- Chthonius terribilis With, 1906

Synonyms
- Pholeochthonius Beier, 1976; Parachthonius Caporiacco, 1949

= Tyrannochthonius =

Genus of pseudoscorpions

Tyrannochthonius is a genus of pseudoscorpions in the family Chthoniidae. It was described in 1929 by American arachnologist Joseph Conrad Chamberlin.

== Species ==
As of October 2023, the World Pseudoscorpiones Catalog accepted the following species:

- T. acutus Hou, Feng & Zhang, 2023
- T. akaelus Mahnert, 2009
- T. alabamensis Muchmore, 1996
- T. aladdinensis Chamberlin, 1995
- T. albidus (Beier, 1977)
- T. altus Hou, Feng & Zhang, 2023
- T. amazonicus Mahnert, 1979
- T. antridraconis Mahnert, 2009
- T. aralu Chamberlin, 1995
- T. archeri Chamberlin, 1995
- T. aridus Edward and Harvey, 2008
- T. arificus Hou, Feng & Zhang, 2023
- T. assimilis Hong and T.H. Kim, 1993
- T. attenuatus Muchmore, 1996
- T. avernicola Chamberlin, 1995
- T. babaowanensis Hou, Feng & Zhang, 2023
- T. bagus Harvey, 1988
- T. bahamensis Muchmore, 1984
- T. barri Muchmore, 1996
- T. basme Edward and Harvey, 2008
- T. beieri Morikawa, 1963
- T. billhumphreysi Edward and Harvey, 2008
- T. binoculatus Muchmore, 1996
- T. bispinosus (Beier, 1974)
- T. brasiliensis Mahnert, 1979
- T. breviculus Hou, Feng & Zhang, 2023
- T. brevimanus Beier, 1935
- T. brevispinus Hou, Feng & Zhang, 2023
- T. brooksi Harvey, 1991
- T. butleri Harvey, 1991
- T. caecatus (Beier, 1976)
- T. cavernicola (Beier, 1976)
- T. cavicola (Beier, 1967)
- T. centralis Beier, 1931
- T. chamberlini Muchmore, 1996
- T. charon Muchmore, 1996
- T. chelatus Murthy and Ananthakrishnan, 1977
- T. chihayanus Sakayori, 2009
- T. chixingi Gao, Wynne & Zhang, 2018
- T. confusus Mahnert, 1986
- T. contractus (Tullgren, 1907)
- T. convivus Beier, 1974
- T. curazavius Wagenaar-Hummelinck, 1948
- T. densedentatus (Beier, 1967)
- T. diabolus Muchmore, 1996
- T. duo Hou, Feng & Zhang, 2023
- T. ecuadoricus (Beier, 1977)
- T. elegans Beier, 1944
- T. erebicus Muchmore, 1996
- T. etu Gao and Zhang, 2013
- T. eua Krajčovičová, Matyukhin and Christophoryová, 2020
- T. felix Muchmore, 1996
- T. fiskei Muchmore, 1996
- T. floridensis Malcolm and Muchmore, 1985
- T. ganshuanensis Mahnert, 2009
- T. garthhumphreysi Edward and Harvey, 2008
- T. gezei Vachon, 1941
- T. gnomus Muchmore, 1996
- T. gomyi Mahnert, 1975
- T. gracilis Hou, Feng & Zhang, 2023
- T. grimmeti Chamberlin, 1929
- T. guadeloupensis Vitali-di Castri, 1984
- T. halopotamus Muchmore, 1996
- T. harveyi Gao, Zhang and Chen, 2020
- T. helenae (Beier, 1977)
- T. heterodentatus Beier, 1930
- T. hispidus Hou, Feng & Zhang, 2023
- T. hoffi Muchmore, 1991
- T. horridus (Beier, 1976)
- T. hypogeus Muchmore, 1996
- T. imitatus Hoff, 1959
- T. infernalis Muchmore, 1996
- T. infirmus Hou, Feng & Zhang, 2023
- T. innominatus Muchmore, 1996
- T. insulae Hoff, 1946
- T. intermedius Muchmore, 1986
- T. japonicus (Ellingsen, 1907)
  - T. j. dogoensis Morikawa, 1954
  - T. j. japonicus (Ellingsen, 1907)
- T. jonesi Chamberlin, 1995
- T. kermadecensis (Beier, 1976)
- T. krakatau Harvey, 1988
- T. laevis Beier, 1966
- T. latus Hou, Feng & Zhang, 2023
- T. luxtoni (Beier, 1967)
- T. maculosus Hou, Feng & Zhang, 2023
- T. mahunkai Mahnert, 1978
- T. meneghettii (Caporiacco, 1949)
- T. meruensis Beier, 1962
- T. migrans Mahnert, 1979
- T. monodi Vachon, 1941
- T. muchmoreorum Cokendolpher, 2009
- T. multicavus Hou, Feng & Zhang, 2023
- T. multidentatus Hou, Feng & Zhang, 2023
- T. nanus (Beier, 1966)
- T. nanxingensis Hou, Feng & Zhang, 2023
- T. nergal Chamberlin, 1995
- T. noaensis Moyle, 1989
- T. norfolkensis (Beier, 1976)
- T. oahuanus Muchmore, 2000
- T. oblongus Hou, Feng & Zhang, 2023
- T. oligochaetus Dashdamirov, 2005
- T. orpheus Muchmore, 1996
- T. osiris Chamberlin, 1995
- T. ovatus Vitali-di Castri, 1984
- T. pachythorax Redikorzev, 1938
- T. palauanus Beier, 1957
- T. pallidus Muchmore, 1973
- T. pandus Hou, Gao & Zhang, 2022
- T. parcidentatus Hou, Feng & Zhang, 2023
- T. parvus Chamberlin, 1995
- T. pecki Muchmore, 1996
- T. perpusillus Beier, 1951
- T. philippinus (Beier, 1966)
- T. pholeter Muchmore, 1996
- T. pictus Hou, Feng & Zhang, 2023
- T. pinguis Hou, Feng & Zhang, 2023
- T. planus Hou, Feng & Zhang, 2023
- T. pluto Chamberlin, 1995
- T. procerus Mahnert, 1978
- T. pupukeanus Muchmore, 1983
- T. pusillimus Beier, 1951
- T. pusillus Beier, 1955
- T. qilinensis Hou, Feng & Zhang, 2023
- T. quattuor Hou, Feng & Zhang, 2023
- T. queenslandicus (Beier, 1969)
- T. rahmi Beier, 1976
- T. rex Harvey, 1989
- T. riberai Mahnert, 1984
- T. robustus Beier, 1951
- T. rotundimanus Mahnert, 1985
- T. satan Muchmore, 1996
- T. semidentatus (Redikorzev, 1924)
- T. semihorridus (Beier, 1969)
- T. sheltae Muchmore, 1996
- T. similidentatus Sato, 1984
- T. simillimus Beier, 1951
- T. simulans Mahnert, 1986
- T. skeletonis Muchmore, 1996
- T. sokolovi (Redikorzev, 1924)
- T. souchomalus Edward and Harvey, 2008
- T. sparsedentatus Beier, 1959
- T. spinatus Hong, 1996
- T. steevesi Muchmore, 1996
- T. stonei Muchmore, 1989
- T. strinatii (Beier, 1974)
- T. stygius Muchmore, 1996
- T. suppressalis Hong, 1996
- T. swiftae Muchmore, 1993
- T. tartarus Muchmore, 1996
- T. tekauriensis Moyle, 1989
- T. tenuis Chamberlin, 1995
- T. terribilis (With, 1906)
  - T. t. malaccensis Beier, 1952
  - T. t. terribilis (With, 1906)
- T. texanus Muchmore, 1992
- T. tlilapanensis Muchmore, 1986
- T. torodei Muchmore, 1996
- T. troglobius Muchmore, 1969
- T. troglodytes Muchmore, 1986
- T. troglophilus (Beier, 1968)
- T. umidus Hou, Feng & Zhang, 2023
- T. vampirorum Muchmore, 1986
- T. volcancillo Muchmore, 1986
- T. volcanus Muchmore, 1977
- T. wittei Beier, 1955
- T. wlassicsi (Daday, 1897)
- T. yanshanensis Hou, Feng & Zhang, 2023
- T. zhai Gao, Zhang and Chen, 2020
- T. zonatus (Beier, 1964)
