= Sathrochthonius =

Scientific classification
- Kingdom: Animalia
- Phylum: Arthropoda
- Subphylum: Chelicerata
- Class: Arachnida
- Order: Pseudoscorpiones
- Family: Chthoniidae
- Genus: Sathrochthonius; J.C.Chamberlin, 1962

Type species
- Sathrochthonius tuena Chamberlin, 1962

Genus of pseudoscorpions

Sathrochthonius is a genus of pseudoscorpions in the family Chthoniidae. It was described in 1962 by American arachnologist Joseph Conrad Chamberlin.

== Species ==
As of October 2023, the World Pseudoscorpiones Catalog accepted the following species:

- Sathrochthonius crassidens Beier, 1966
- Sathrochthonius insulanus Beier, 1976
- Sathrochthonius kaltenbachi Beier, 1966
- Sathrochthonius maoricus Beier, 1976
- Sathrochthonius pefauri Vitali-di Castri, 1974
- Sathrochthonius tuena Chamberlin, 1962
- Sathrochthonius venezuelanus Muchmore, 1989
- Sathrochthonius webbi Muchmore, 1982
