= Sathrochthonius webbi =

Scientific classification
- Kingdom: Animalia
- Phylum: Arthropoda
- Subphylum: Chelicerata
- Class: Arachnida
- Order: Pseudoscorpiones
- Family: Chthoniidae
- Genus: Sathrochthonius
- Species: S. webbi

Binomial name
- Sathrochthonius webbi Muchmore, 1982

Species of pseudoscorpion

Sathrochthonius webbi is a species of pseudoscorpion in the Chthoniidae family. It is endemic to Australia. It was described in 1982 by American arachnologist William Muchmore. The specific epithet webbi honours John A. Webb who collected the type specimens.

== Description ==
Body lengths are 1.3–1.8 mm. Eyes are lacking.

== Distribution and habitat ==
The species occurs in south-eastern Queensland. The type locality is the Holy Jump Lava Cave, 25 km east of Warwick, where the specimens were collected from bat guano.

== Behaviour ==
The pseudoscorpions are cave-dwelling, terrestrial predators.
