= Chthonius minotaurus =

Scientific classification
- Domain: Eukaryota
- Kingdom: Animalia
- Phylum: Arthropoda
- Subphylum: Chelicerata
- Class: Arachnida
- Order: Pseudoscorpiones
- Family: Chthoniidae
- Genus: Chthonius
- Species: C. minotaurus

Binomial name
- Chthonius minotaurus Henderickx, 1997

Species of pseudoscorpion

Chthonius minotaurus is a species of pseudoscorpion in the Chthoniidae family that is endemic to Crete.

== Description ==
The species colour is reddish-orange.
