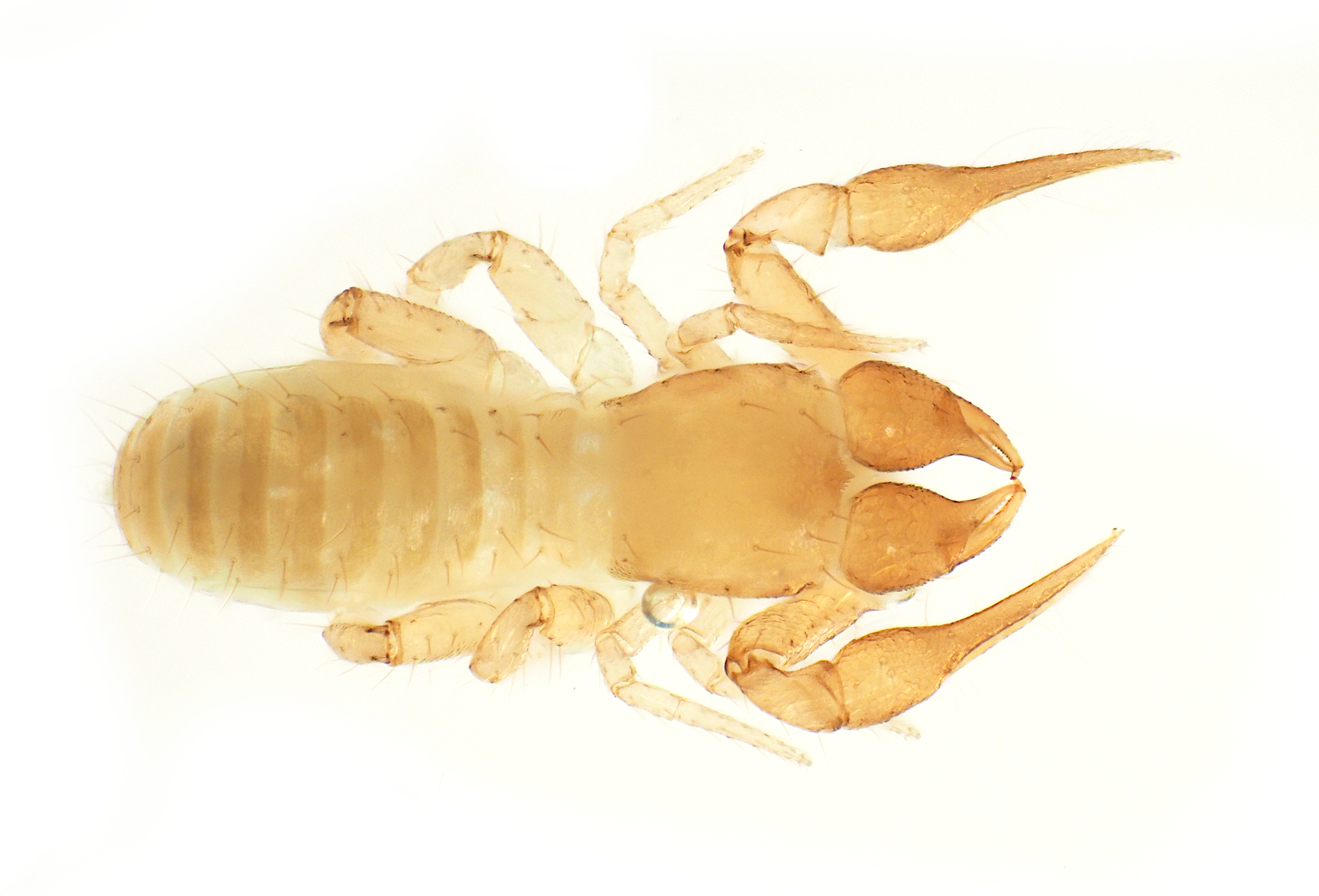

Scientific classification
- Kingdom: Animalia
- Phylum: Arthropoda
- Subphylum: Chelicerata
- Class: Arachnida
- Order: Pseudoscorpiones
- Family: Chthoniidae
- Genus: Austrochthonius; J.C.Chamberlin, 1929

Type species
- Chthonius chilensis Chamberlin, 1923

Synonyms
- Paraustrochthonius Beier, 1931; Cecoditha Mello-Leitão, 1939

= Austrochthonius =

Genus of pseudoscorpions

Austrochthonius is a genus of pseudoscorpions in the family Chthoniidae. It was described in 1929 by American arachnologist Joseph Conrad Chamberlin.

== Species ==
As of September 2023, the World Pseudoscorpiones Catalog accepted the following species:

- Austrochthonius argentinae Hoff, 1950
- Austrochthonius australis Hoff, 1951
- Austrochthonius bolivianus Beier, 1930
- Austrochthonius cavicola Beier, 1968
- Austrochthonius chilensis (Chamberlin, 1923)
- Austrochthonius easti Harvey, 1991
- Austrochthonius iguazuensis Vitali-di Castri, 1975
- Austrochthonius insularis Vitali-di Castri, 1968
- Austrochthonius mordax Beier, 1967
- Austrochthonius muchmorei Harvey and Mould, 2006
- Austrochthonius paraguayensis Vitali-di Castri, 1975
- Austrochthonius parvus (Mello-Leitão, 1939)
- Austrochthonius persimilis Beier, 1930
- Austrochthonius rapax Beier, 1976
- Austrochthonius semiserratus Beier, 1930
- Austrochthonius strigosus Harvey and Mould, 2006
- Austrochthonius tullgreni (Beier, 1931)
- Austrochthonius zealandicus Beier, 1966
