= Austrochthonius easti =

Scientific classification
- Kingdom: Animalia
- Phylum: Arthropoda
- Subphylum: Chelicerata
- Class: Arachnida
- Order: Pseudoscorpiones
- Family: Chthoniidae
- Genus: Austrochthonius
- Species: A. easti

Binomial name
- Austrochthonius easti Harvey, 1991

Species of pseudoscorpion

Austrochthonius easti is a species of pseudoscorpion in the Chthoniidae family. It is endemic to Australia. It was described in 1991 by Australian arachnologist Mark Harvey. The specific epithet easti honours Malcolm East, who collected one of the specimens.

== Description ==
The holotype male has a body length of 1.19 mm. It has two small eyes, and is light reddish-brown in colour.

== Distribution and habitat ==
The species occurs in north-west Western Australia. The type locality is Dry Swallett Cave, C-18, Cape Range National Park.

== Behaviour ==
The pseudoscorpions are cave-dwelling terrestrial predators.
