= Sathrochthonius tuena =

Scientific classification
- Kingdom: Animalia
- Phylum: Arthropoda
- Subphylum: Chelicerata
- Class: Arachnida
- Order: Pseudoscorpiones
- Family: Chthoniidae
- Genus: Sathrochthonius
- Species: S. tuena

Binomial name
- Sathrochthonius tuena Chamberlin, 1962

Species of pseudoscorpion

Sathrochthonius tuena is a species of pseudoscorpion in the Chthoniidae family. It is endemic to Australia. It was described in 1962 by American arachnologist Joseph Conrad Chamberlin.

== Distribution and habitat ==
The species occurs in eastern New South Wales. The type locality is ‘probably in the Blue Mountains near Sydney’.

== Behaviour ==
The pseudoscorpions are cave-dwelling, terrestrial predators.
