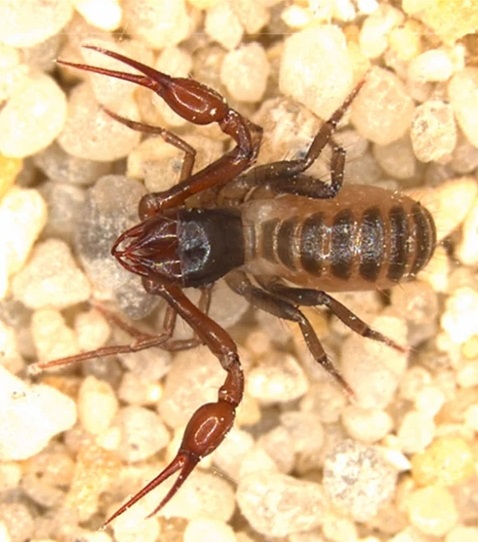
- Pseudotyrannochthonius giganteus from Western Australia
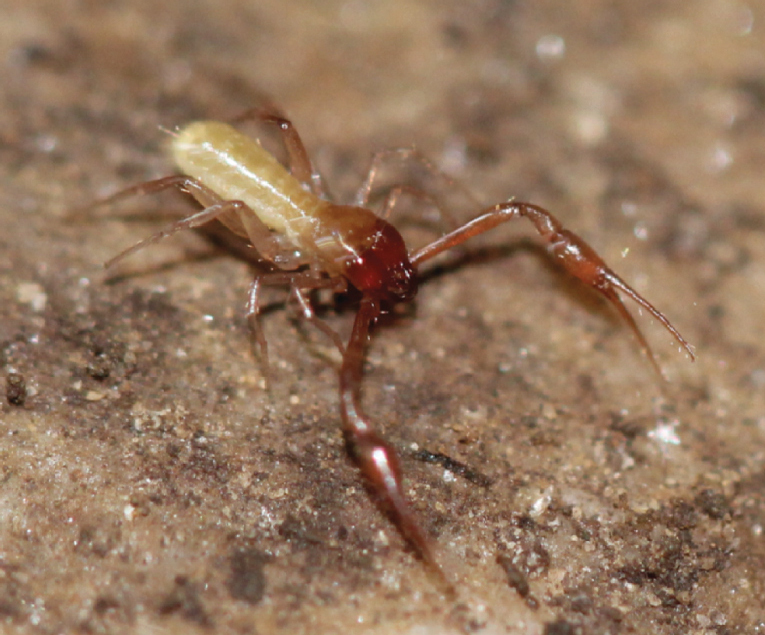
- Selachochthonius naledi observed in South Africa

Scientific classification
- Kingdom: Animalia
- Phylum: Arthropoda
- Subphylum: Chelicerata
- Class: Arachnida
- Order: Pseudoscorpiones
- Superfamily: Chthonioidea
- Family: Pseudotyrannochthoniidae; Beier, 1932

Genera
- See text

= Pseudotyrannochthoniidae =

Pseudotyrannochthoniidae Temporal range: Eocene–Recent

Family of arachnids

Pseudotyrannochthoniidae is a family of pseudoscorpions, belonging to the superfamily Chthonioidea. It is one of the most primitive living groups of pseudoscorpions and contains fewer than 100 species in 6 genera. Living members of the group have a strongly disjunct distribution with a preference for humid Mediterranean and temperate forest habitats, likely reflecting ancient vicariance from the breakup of Pangaea, with species occurring in Australia, Asia, Southern Africa and Madagascar, Western North America and southern South America. Fossils species are known from the Eocene Baltic and Bitterfeld amber, which represent members of extant Asian genera, though the group likely has a much older origin during the Mesozoic, with diversification during the Cretaceous.

== Taxonomy ==
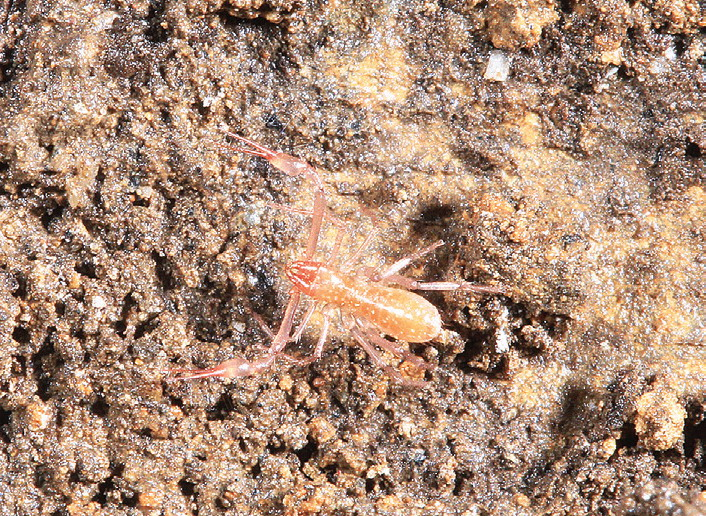
Spelaeochthonius wulibeiensis observed in China

- Afrochthonius Beier, 1930 South Africa, Madagascar and Sri Lanka (paraphyletic)
- Allochthonius Chamberlin, 1929 East Asia (Fossil species known from Baltic amber)
- Centrochthonius Beier, 1931 Central Asia (Fossil species known from Bitterfeld amber)
- Pseudotyrannochthonius Beier, 1930 from Chile, Australia, eastern Asia, and the western United States (paraphyletic)
- Selachochthonius Chamberlin, 1929 South Africa
- Spelaeochthonius Morikawa, 1954 East Asia
- Karrichthonius Harms et al. 2025 Australia.

Phylogeny (with the exclusion of Centrochthonius and the later described Karrichthonius) after Harms et al. 2024:

- Chthonioidea
  - Chthoniidae
  - Pseudotyrannochthoniidae
    - - Spelaeochthonius (East Asia)
      - Pseudotyrannochthonius (Western North American species)
    - - Allochthonius (Eastern Asia)
      - - - Selachochthonius +Afrochthonius (Southern Africa, Madagascar)
          - Afrochthonius (Madagascar, Sri Lanka)
        - - Pseudotyrannochthonius (Australian species)
          - - Pseudotyrannochthonius (Australian species)
            - Pseudotyrannochthonius (Southern South American species)
