= Max Beier =

Viennese zoologist (1903–1979)

Max Beier (6 April 1903 in Spittal an der Drau – 4 July 1979 in Vienna) was an Austrian arachnologist and entomologist.

He studied zoology at the University of Vienna, and obtained his doctorate there in 1927. He took up a post at the Natural History Museum in Vienna, in the same year, developing an expertise in pseudoscorpions.

He was appointed Director of the zoological department of the Vienna Museum in 1962, and retired in 1968.

A list of Beier's 398 scientific papers was published, with an obituary, in Annalen des Naturhistorischen Museums in Wien. 252 were on pseudoscorpions. He described and named over 1200 pseudoscorpion species of which 1180 were still valid in 2007.

He was editor of the Orthopterorum Catalogus and an updated edition of the volume on insects in the Handbuch der Zoologie.

== Awards ==
Beier was awarded the Fabricius Medal in January 1967 of Deutsche Gesellschaft für Allgemeine und Angewandte Entomologie (German entomology society). In July 1968 he was granted an honorary doctorate by the University of Innsbruck.

== Personal life ==
Beier and his wife, Irmgard were married in 1931. His death on 4 July 1979 was unexpected.
