= Afrosternophorus nanus =

Scientific classification
- Kingdom: Animalia
- Phylum: Arthropoda
- Subphylum: Chelicerata
- Class: Arachnida
- Order: Pseudoscorpiones
- Family: Sternophoridae
- Genus: Afrosternophorus
- Species: A. nanus

Binomial name
- Afrosternophorus nanus Harvey, 1985

Species of pseudoscorpion

Afrosternophorus nanus is a species of pseudoscorpion in the Sternophoridae family. It was described in 1985 by Australian arachnologist Mark Harvey. The specific epithet nanus (Latin: 'dwarf') refers to the small size of the species.

== Description ==
Body lengths of males are 1.6–1.7 mm; those of females are unknown.

== Distribution and habitat ==
The species occurs in the Top End of the Northern Territory. The type locality is Rum Jungle. The pseudoscorpion specimens were found under eucalypt bark.

== Behaviour ==
The pseudoscorpions are terrestrial predators.
