= Afrosternophorus xalyx =

Scientific classification
- Kingdom: Animalia
- Phylum: Arthropoda
- Subphylum: Chelicerata
- Class: Arachnida
- Order: Pseudoscorpiones
- Family: Sternophoridae
- Genus: Afrosternophorus
- Species: A. xalyx

Binomial name
- Afrosternophorus xalyx Harvey, 1985

Species of pseudoscorpion

Afrosternophorus xalyx is a species of pseudoscorpion in the Sternophoridae family. It is endemic to Australia. It was described in 1985 by Australian arachnologist Mark Harvey. The specific epithet xalyx is an arbitrary combination of letters with no intrinsic meaning.

== Description ==
Body lengths of males are 1.6–1.8 mm; those of females 1.7–2.5 mm.

== Distribution and habitat ==
The species occurs in North Queensland. The type locality is Townsville. The pseudoscorpion specimens were found under eucalypt bark.

== Behaviour ==
The pseudoscorpions are terrestrial predators.
