= Geogarypus connatus =

Scientific classification
- Kingdom: Animalia
- Phylum: Arthropoda
- Subphylum: Chelicerata
- Class: Arachnida
- Order: Pseudoscorpiones
- Family: Geogarypidae
- Genus: Geogarypus
- Species: G. connatus

Binomial name
- Geogarypus connatus Harvey, 1986

Species of pseudoscorpion

Geogarypus connatus is a species of pseudoscorpion in the Geogarypidae family. It was described in 1986 by Australian arachnologist Mark Harvey.

== Distribution and habitat ==
The species occurs in south-eastern Australia, in Queensland, New South Wales and Victoria, within the Murray-Darling Basin. The type locality is Horseshoe Bend in the Little Desert National Park in western Victoria.

== Behaviour ==
The pseudoscorpions are terrestrial predators.
