= Feaella callani =

Scientific classification
- Kingdom: Animalia
- Phylum: Arthropoda
- Subphylum: Chelicerata
- Class: Arachnida
- Order: Pseudoscorpiones
- Family: Feaellidae
- Genus: Feaella
- Species: F. callani

Binomial name
- Feaella callani Harvey, Abrams, Beavis, Hillyer & Huey2016

Species of pseudoscorpion

Feaella callani is a species of pseudoscorpion in the Feaellidae family. It is endemic to Australia. It was described in 2016 by Australian arachnologists Mark Harvey, Kym Abrams, Amber Beavis, Mia Hillyer and Joel Huey.

== Distribution and habitat ==
The species occurs in the Pilbara region of North West Australia. The type locality is 7 km north of Newman.

== Behaviour ==
The pseudoscorpions are terrestrial predators that inhabit plant litter.
