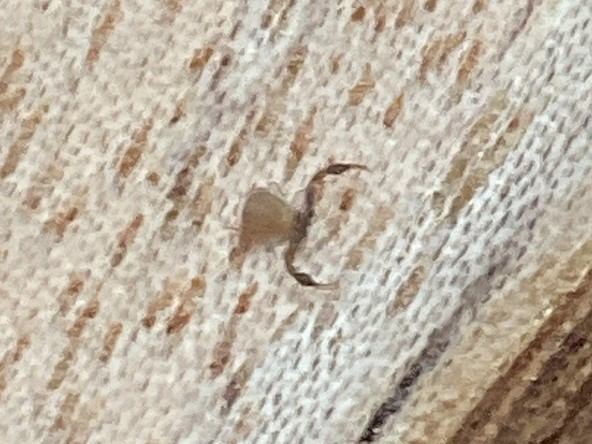

Scientific classification
- Kingdom: Animalia
- Phylum: Arthropoda
- Subphylum: Chelicerata
- Class: Arachnida
- Order: Pseudoscorpiones
- Family: Geogarypidae
- Genus: Geogarypus
- Species: G. longidigitatus

Binomial name
- Geogarypus longidigitatus (Rainbow, 1897)

Synonyms
- Chelifer longidigitatus Rainbow, 1897; Garypus personatus Simon, 1900; Garypus javanus Tullgren, 1905; Geogarypus formosanus Beier, 1931; Geogarypus (Geogarypus) marquesianus Chamberlin, 1939; Geogarypus (Geogarypus) audyi Beier, 1952; Geogarypus (Geogarypus) micronesiensis Morikawa, 1952; Geogarypus (Geogarypus) javanus takensis Beier, 1967

= Geogarypus longidigitatus =

Species of pseudoscorpion

Geogarypus longidigitatus is a species of pseudoscorpion in the family Geogarypidae. It was first described in 1897 by Australian arachnologist William Joseph Rainbow. Subsequently, several other described species were synonymised with it by Mark Harvey.

== Distribution and habitat ==
The species occurs widely in Oceania and Southeast Asia in tropical and subtropical habitats. It inhabits plant litter and soil, and may also be found beneath bark and stones.

== Behaviour ==
The pseudoscorpions are terrestrial predators.
