= Anatemnus subvastus =

Scientific classification
- Kingdom: Animalia
- Phylum: Arthropoda
- Subphylum: Chelicerata
- Class: Arachnida
- Order: Pseudoscorpiones
- Family: Atemnidae
- Genus: Anatemnus
- Species: A. subvastus

Binomial name
- Anatemnus subvastus Alexander, Burger & Harvey, 2014

Species of pseudoscorpion

Anatemnus subvastus is a species of pseudoscorpion in the Atemnidae family. It is endemic to Australia. It was described in 2014 by Australian arachnologists Jason Alexander, Mieke Burger and Mark Harvey. The specific epithet subvastus, from Latin: sub ('under') and vastus ('waste' or 'desert'), refers to the species’ underground habitat in the semi-arid Pilbara.

== Description ==
The body length of males is 2.24–2.66 mm; that of the female paratype 2.83 mm. The colour of the carapace and pedipalps is dark reddish-brown, the coxae reddish-brown, and abdomen and legs pale yellowish-brown. Eyes are absent.

== Distribution and habitat ==
The species occurs in the Hamersley Range of the central Pilbara region of North West Australia. The type locality is Blackjack, 75 km north-north-west of Tom Price, where the pseudoscorpions were found in subterranean habitats.

== Behaviour ==
The pseudoscorpions are hypogean, terrestrial predators.
