= Geogarypus exochus =

Scientific classification
- Kingdom: Animalia
- Phylum: Arthropoda
- Subphylum: Chelicerata
- Class: Arachnida
- Order: Pseudoscorpiones
- Family: Geogarypidae
- Genus: Geogarypus
- Species: G. exochus

Binomial name
- Geogarypus exochus Harvey, 1986

Species of pseudoscorpion

Geogarypus exochus is a species of pseudoscorpion in the Geogarypidae family. It was described in 1986 by Australian arachnologist Mark Harvey.

== Distribution and habitat ==
The species occurs in the Mackay Region of central eastern Queensland. It has also been recorded from a site about 40 km north-east of Alice Springs in the Northern Territory. The type locality is 140 km south of Mackay.

== Behaviour ==
The pseudoscorpions are terrestrial predators that inhabit plant litter.
