= Geogarypus plusculus =

Scientific classification
- Kingdom: Animalia
- Phylum: Arthropoda
- Subphylum: Chelicerata
- Class: Arachnida
- Order: Pseudoscorpiones
- Family: Geogarypidae
- Genus: Geogarypus
- Species: G. plusculus

Binomial name
- Geogarypus plusculus Cullen & Harvey, 2021

Species of pseudoscorpion

Geogarypus plusculus is a species of pseudoscorpion in the Geogarypidae family. It is endemic to Australia. It was described in 2021 by Australian arachnologists Karen Cullen and Mark Harvey. The specific epithet plusculus (Latin: 'a little more') refers to it being yet another species in the genus.

== Description ==
The body length of the male holotype is 1.65 mm. The overall colour is brown to reddish-brown, with some paler and darker patches.

== Distribution and habitat ==
The species occurs in North West Australia. The type locality is the Shothole Canyon Road lookout in the Cape Range National Park, where the holotype was found beneath rocks.

== Behaviour ==
The pseudoscorpions are terrestrial predators.
