= Thenmus aigialites =

Scientific classification
- Kingdom: Animalia
- Phylum: Arthropoda
- Subphylum: Chelicerata
- Class: Arachnida
- Order: Pseudoscorpiones
- Family: Menthidae
- Genus: Thenmus
- Species: T. aigialites

Binomial name
- Thenmus aigialites Harvey, 1990

Species of pseudoscorpion

Thenmus aigialites is a species of pseudoscorpion in the Menthidae family. It is endemic to Australia. It was described in 1990 by Australian arachnologist Mark Harvey.

== Distribution and habitat ==
The species occurs in the Mackay Region of coastal eastern Queensland. The type locality is Finlaysons Point, 2 km north-west of Seaforth. The pseudoscorpions were found in plant litter.

== Behaviour ==
The pseudoscorpions are terrestrial predators.
