= Geogarypus taylori =

Scientific classification
- Kingdom: Animalia
- Phylum: Arthropoda
- Subphylum: Chelicerata
- Class: Arachnida
- Order: Pseudoscorpiones
- Family: Geogarypidae
- Genus: Geogarypus
- Species: G. taylori

Binomial name
- Geogarypus taylori Harvey, 1986

Species of pseudoscorpion

Geogarypus taylori is a species of pseudoscorpion in the Geogarypidae family. It is endemic to Australia. It was described in 1986 by Australian arachnologist Mark Harvey.

== Distribution and habitat ==
The species occurs in New South Wales, the Northern Territory, South Australia, Victoria and Western Australia. The type locality is the Lerderderg Gorge, 9 km north-north-west of Bacchus Marsh in Victoria.

== Behaviour ==
The pseudoscorpions are terrestrial predators that inhabit plant litter.
