= Thenmus augustus =

Scientific classification
- Kingdom: Animalia
- Phylum: Arthropoda
- Subphylum: Chelicerata
- Class: Arachnida
- Order: Pseudoscorpiones
- Family: Menthidae
- Genus: Thenmus
- Species: T. augustus

Binomial name
- Thenmus augustus Harvey, 2006

Species of pseudoscorpion

Thenmus augustus is a species of pseudoscorpion in the Menthidae family. It is endemic to Australia. It was described in 2006 by Australian arachnologist Mark Harvey. The specific epithet augustus refers to the type locality.

== Description ==
The body length of the male holotype is 1.23 mm; that of the female paratype 1.57 mm. The colour is generally very pale, with the front of the carapace and the pedipalps reddish-brown.

== Distribution and habitat ==
The species occurs in the Kimberley region of North West Australia. The type locality is 2.4 km north of Augustus Point on Augustus Island. The pseudoscorpions were found in rainforest plant litter.

== Behaviour ==
The pseudoscorpions are terrestrial predators.
