= Anatemnus wongalara =

Scientific classification
- Kingdom: Animalia
- Phylum: Arthropoda
- Subphylum: Chelicerata
- Class: Arachnida
- Order: Pseudoscorpiones
- Family: Atemnidae
- Genus: Anatemnus
- Species: A. wongalara

Binomial name
- Anatemnus wongalara Harvey & Cullen, 2021

Species of pseudoscorpion

Anatemnus wongalara is a species of pseudoscorpion in the Atemnidae family. It is endemic to Australia. It was described in 2021 by Australian arachnologists Mark Harvey and Karen Cullen. The specific epithet wongalara ('common') refers to the type locality.

== Description ==
The body length of the male holotype is 2.78 mm; that of the female paratype 2.80 mm. The colour of the pedipalps is reddish-brown, the carapace paler, and the legs yellowish-brown.

== Distribution and habitat ==
The species occurs in the Top End of the Northern Territory. The type locality is Bokalla Creek in the Wongalara Sanctuary, where the pseudoscorpions were found in tropical vine thicket litter on a low rocky hill.

== Behaviour ==
The pseudoscorpions are terrestrial predators.
