= Feaella linetteae =

Scientific classification
- Kingdom: Animalia
- Phylum: Arthropoda
- Subphylum: Chelicerata
- Class: Arachnida
- Order: Pseudoscorpiones
- Family: Feaellidae
- Genus: Feaella
- Species: F. linetteae

Binomial name
- Feaella linetteae Harvey, Abrams, Beavis, Hillyer & Huey2016

Species of pseudoscorpion

Feaella linetteae is a species of pseudoscorpion in the Feaellidae family. It is endemic to Australia. It was described in 2016 by Australian arachnologists Mark Harvey, Kym Abrams, Amber Beavis, Mia Hillyer and Joel Huey.

== Distribution and habitat ==
The species occurs in the Pilbara region of North West Australia. The type locality is 2.2 km south-east of Mount Montagu in the Millstream Chichester National Park.

== Behaviour ==
The pseudoscorpions are terrestrial predators that inhabit plant litter.
