= Feaella anderseni =

Scientific classification
- Kingdom: Animalia
- Phylum: Arthropoda
- Subphylum: Chelicerata
- Class: Arachnida
- Order: Pseudoscorpiones
- Family: Feaellidae
- Genus: Feaella
- Species: F. anderseni

Binomial name
- Feaella anderseni Harvey, 1989

Species of pseudoscorpion

Feaella anderseni is a species of pseudoscorpion in the Feaellidae family. It is endemic to Australia. It was described in 1989 by Australian arachnologist Mark Harvey. The specific epithet anderseni honours Alan Andersen, collector of some of the specimens.

== Description ==
The adult body length is 2.15–2.54 mm. The colour is reddish-brown.

== Distribution and habitat ==
The species occurs in the Kimberley region of North West Australia. The type locality is Cape Bougainville, some 75 km north-west of Kalumburu, where the holotype was found in vine thicket litter.

== Behaviour ==
The pseudoscorpions are terrestrial predators that inhabit plant litter.
