= Geogarypus facetus =

Scientific classification
- Kingdom: Animalia
- Phylum: Arthropoda
- Subphylum: Chelicerata
- Class: Arachnida
- Order: Pseudoscorpiones
- Family: Geogarypidae
- Genus: Geogarypus
- Species: G. facetus

Binomial name
- Geogarypus facetus Cullen & Harvey, 2021

Species of pseudoscorpion

Geogarypus facetus is a species of pseudoscorpion in the Geogarypidae family. It is endemic to Australia. It was described in 2021 by Australian arachnologists Karen Cullen and Mark Harvey. The specific epithet facetus (Latin: 'fine' or 'elegant') refers to the beauty of the species.

== Description ==
The body length of the male holotype is 1.55 mm. The overall colour is brown, with some paler and darker patches.

== Distribution and habitat ==
The species occurs in the Top End of the Northern Territory. The type locality is Wongalara, some 120 km south-east of Kakadu National Park, where the holotype was found beneath rocks.

== Behaviour ==
The pseudoscorpions are terrestrial predators that inhabit plant litter.
