= Feaella tealei =

Scientific classification
- Kingdom: Animalia
- Phylum: Arthropoda
- Subphylum: Chelicerata
- Class: Arachnida
- Order: Pseudoscorpiones
- Family: Feaellidae
- Genus: Feaella
- Species: F. tealei

Binomial name
- Feaella tealei Harvey, Abrams, Beavis, Hillyer & Huey2016

Species of pseudoscorpion

Feaella tealei is a species of pseudoscorpion in the Feaellidae family. It is endemic to Australia. It was described in 2016 by Australian arachnologists Mark Harvey, Kym Abrams, Amber Beavis, Mia Hillyer and Joel Huey.

== Distribution and habitat ==
The species occurs in the Pilbara region of North West Australia. The type locality is Sulphur Springs, about 140 km south-east of Port Hedland and 60 km west of Marble Bar.

== Behaviour ==
The pseudoscorpions are terrestrial predators that inhabit plant litter.
