= Geogarypus pisinnus =

Scientific classification
- Kingdom: Animalia
- Phylum: Arthropoda
- Subphylum: Chelicerata
- Class: Arachnida
- Order: Pseudoscorpiones
- Family: Geogarypidae
- Genus: Geogarypus
- Species: G. pisinnus

Binomial name
- Geogarypus pisinnus Harvey, 1986

Species of pseudoscorpion

Geogarypus pisinnus is a species of pseudoscorpion in the Geogarypidae family. It is endemic to Australia. It was described in 1986 by Australian arachnologist Mark Harvey.

== Distribution and habitat ==
The species occurs in the tropical Top End of the Northern Territory in closed forest habitats. The type locality is the Arnhem Highway at the South Alligator River bridge in Kakadu National Park.

== Behaviour ==
The pseudoscorpions are terrestrial predators that inhabit plant litter.
