= Afrosternophorus anabates =

Scientific classification
- Kingdom: Animalia
- Phylum: Arthropoda
- Subphylum: Chelicerata
- Class: Arachnida
- Order: Pseudoscorpiones
- Family: Sternophoridae
- Genus: Afrosternophorus
- Species: A. anabates

Binomial name
- Afrosternophorus anabates Harvey, 1985

Species of pseudoscorpion

Afrosternophorus anabates is a species of pseudoscorpion in the Sternophoridae family. It was described in 1985 by Australian arachnologist Mark Harvey. The specific epithet anabates (Greek: 'rider' or 'passenger') refers to the phoretic behaviour shown by some specimens.

== Description ==
Body lengths of males are 2.2–2.5 mm; those of females 2.4–3.4 mm.

== Distribution and habitat ==
The species occurs in Victoria. The type locality is Lake Albacutya Park, 15 km west-north-west of Yaapeet, in the Wimmera region. Some of the pseudoscorpions were found under river red gum bark, with some found on spiders (Delena cancerides and Isopeda sp.).

== Behaviour ==
The pseudoscorpions are phoretic, terrestrial predators.
