= Paratemnoides pococki =

Scientific classification
- Kingdom: Animalia
- Phylum: Arthropoda
- Subphylum: Chelicerata
- Class: Arachnida
- Order: Pseudoscorpiones
- Family: Atemnidae
- Genus: Paratemnoides
- Species: P. pococki

Binomial name
- Paratemnoides pococki (With, 1907)

Synonyms
- Chelifer pococki With, 1907

Species of pseudoscorpion

Paratemnoides pococki is a species of pseudoscorpion in the Atemnidae family. It is endemic to Australia. It was described in 1907 by Danish arachnologist Carl Johannes With.

== Distribution and habitat ==
The species occurs on the Australian territory of Christmas Island in the eastern Indian Ocean. The type locality is the north coast of the island.

== Behaviour ==
The pseudoscorpions are terrestrial predators.
