= Oratemnus distinctus =

Scientific classification
- Kingdom: Animalia
- Phylum: Arthropoda
- Subphylum: Chelicerata
- Class: Arachnida
- Order: Pseudoscorpiones
- Family: Atemnidae
- Genus: Oratemnus
- Species: O. distinctus

Binomial name
- Oratemnus distinctus (Beier, 1948)

Synonyms
- Steiratemnus distinctus Beier, 1948

Species of pseudoscorpion

Oratemnus distinctus is a species of pseudoscorpion in the Atemnidae family. It is endemic to Australia. It was described in 1948 by Austrian arachnologist Max Beier.

== Distribution and habitat ==
The species has been recorded from New South Wales and Western Australia. The type locality is simply given as “New South Wales”.

== Behaviour ==
The pseudoscorpions are terrestrial predators.
