= Oratemnus punctatus =

Scientific classification
- Kingdom: Animalia
- Phylum: Arthropoda
- Subphylum: Chelicerata
- Class: Arachnida
- Order: Pseudoscorpiones
- Family: Atemnidae
- Genus: Oratemnus
- Species: O. punctatus

Binomial name
- Oratemnus punctatus (L.Koch & Keyserling, 1885)

Synonyms
- Chelifer punctatus L.Koch & Keyserling, 1885; Chelifer brevidigitatus L.Koch & Keyserling, 1885

Species of pseudoscorpion

Oratemnus punctatus is a species of pseudoscorpion in the Atemnidae family. It is endemic to Australia. It was described in 1885 by German arachnologists Ludwig Carl Christian Koch and Eugen von Keyserling.

== Distribution and habitat ==
The species occurs widely across mainland Australia as well as on Lord Howe Island in the Tasman Sea. The type locality is Gayndah in the North Burnett Region of south-east Queensland. The pseudoscorpions have been found under bark and stones, and in plant litter.

== Behaviour ==
The pseudoscorpions are terrestrial predators.
