= Pseudochiridium clavigerum =

Scientific classification
- Kingdom: Animalia
- Phylum: Arthropoda
- Subphylum: Chelicerata
- Class: Arachnida
- Order: Pseudoscorpiones
- Family: Pseudochiridiidae
- Genus: Pseudochiridium
- Species: P. clavigerum

Binomial name
- Pseudochiridium clavigerum (Thorell, 1889)

Synonyms
- Chelifer claviger Thorell, 1889; Pseudochiridium sundaicum Beier, 1953

Species of pseudoscorpion

Pseudochiridium clavigerum is a species of pseudoscorpion in the Pseudochiridiidae family. It was described in 1889 by Swedish arachnologist Tamerlan Thorell.

== Distribution and habitat ==
The species occurs in the Andaman Islands, Nepal, South East Asia, Wallacea, New Guinea and the Australian territory of Christmas Island. The type locality is Bhamo in northern Myanmar.

== Behaviour ==
The pseudoscorpions are cave-dwelling, terrestrial predators.
