= Geogarypus rhantus =

Scientific classification
- Kingdom: Animalia
- Phylum: Arthropoda
- Subphylum: Chelicerata
- Class: Arachnida
- Order: Pseudoscorpiones
- Family: Geogarypidae
- Genus: Geogarypus
- Species: G. rhantus

Binomial name
- Geogarypus rhantus Harvey, 1981

Species of pseudoscorpion

Geogarypus rhantus is a species of pseudoscorpion in the Geogarypidae family. It was described in 1981 by Australian arachnologist Mark Harvey. The specific epithet rhantus comes from the Greek rhantos (‘sprinkled’ or ‘spotted’), with reference to the star-shaped granulations on the carapace and pedipalps.

== Description ==
The body length of males is 1.5–2.0 mm; that of females 2.0–2.3 mm. The colour is mainly brown, with some white markings.

== Distribution and habitat ==
The species occurs in tropical Far North Queensland. It inhabits plant litter in closed forest habitats. The type locality is Lamond Hill in the Iron Range, Cape York Peninsula.

== Behaviour ==
The pseudoscorpions are terrestrial predators.
