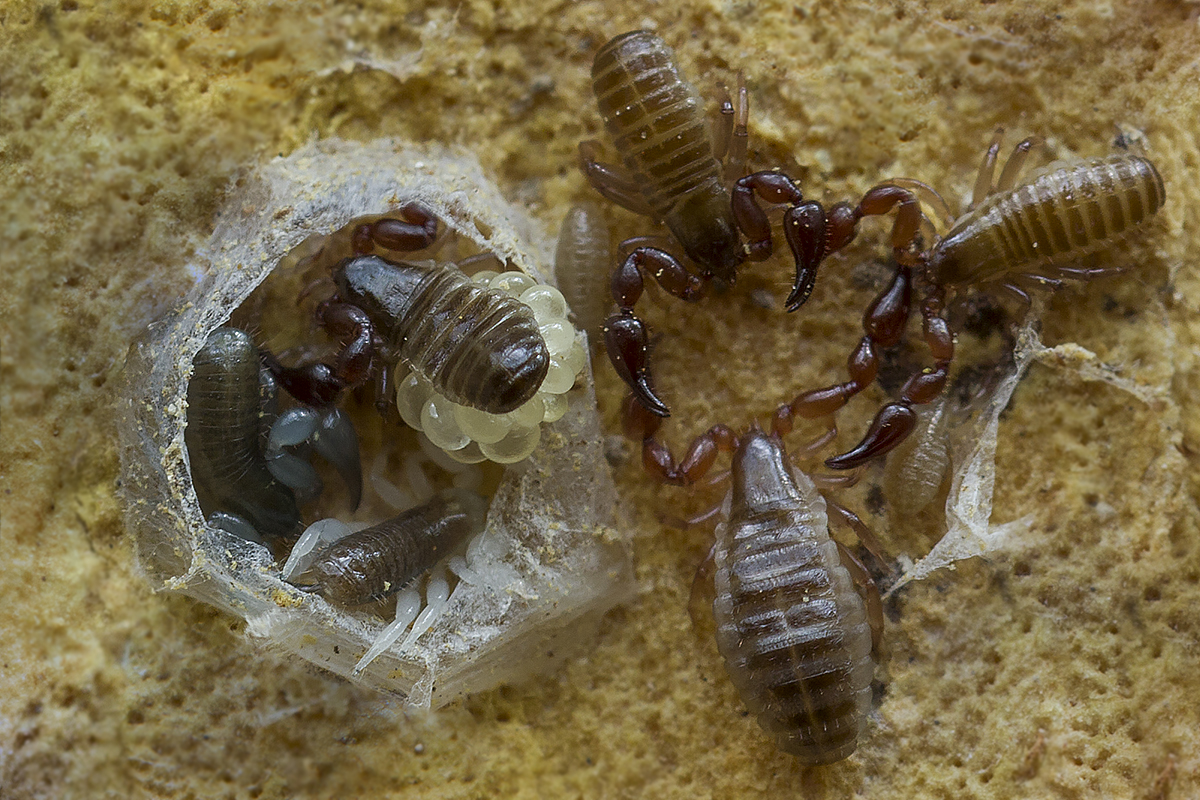
- Paratemnoides nidificator

Scientific classification
- Kingdom: Animalia
- Phylum: Arthropoda
- Subphylum: Chelicerata
- Class: Arachnida
- Order: Pseudoscorpiones
- Family: Atemnidae
- Genus: Paratemnoides
- Species: P. nidificator

Binomial name
- Paratemnoides nidificator (Balzan, 1888)

Synonyms
- Paratemnoides minor Balzan, 1892; Paratemnoides elongatus Banks, 1895

= Paratemnoides nidificator =

Species of pseudoscoporpion

Paratemnoides nidificator is a widely-distributed species of neotropic pseudoscorpion in the family Atemnidae. It lives in colonies and is one of only a few species of arachnids known to engage in complex social behavior.

== Distribution and habitat ==
P. nidificator occurs throughout the neotropics, ranging from Florida in the United States to the Cerrado of Brazil. It lives beneath the bark of trees, including members of the families Fabaceae, Vochysiaceae, and Pinaceae. In Minas Gerais, Brazil they are common under the bark of Caesalpinia peltophoroides.

== Diet ==
P. nidificator is a small (3-7mm) sit and wait predator which captures prey by reaching its pedipalps out of crevices in the bark and opportunistically grabbing passing arthropods. Once it has grasped a prey item, the pseudoscorpion will use the bark opening to trap and process its prey. P. nidificator is a generalist, feeding on diverse arthropods including beetles, ants, true bugs, flies, moths, earwigs, neuropterans, spiders, harvestmen, millipedes, and isopods.

P. nidificator engages in cooperative hunting behavior, allowing it to capture prey items up to thirty times as large as can obtained by an individual pseudoscorpion. The majority of prey capture is done by adults, but nymphs will sometimes join in cooperative hunting.

== Behavior and reproduction ==
P. nidificator is one of very few arachnids to live colonially and is the only known colonial pseudoscorpion in the Americas. Multi-generational colonies may contain up to 200 individuals. Nymphs cooperate to build protective, silken, molt chambers within which they undergo ecdysis. Reproductive females individually build silken reproductive chambers where they lay their eggs. As their offspring develop, females and their young will leave the chamber, rejoining the rest of the colony where they will be fed with prey captured by other individuals. Under extreme food deprivation, reproductive females will allow themselves to be predated by their offspring, a process known as matriphagy.

Colonies reproduce through phoresis, in which groups of adult pseudoscorpions use their pedipalps to attach onto a passing arthropod and be carried to another site. Known phoretic hosts include true bugs, beetles, neuropterans, and earwigs. The phoretic host is consumed upon arrival to a new site, providing resources for the new colony to begin reproduction. New colonies may also form through the fission of large colonies.

== Parasitism by Parachernes melanopygus ==
The pseudoscorpion Parachernes melanopygus of the family Chernetidae is a brood parasite of P. nidificator. P. nidificator is intolerant of other species of pseudoscorpions within its colonies but P. melanopygus is able to evade detection, likely through adoption of the colony's scent. Reproductive P. melanopygus females will steal silken molt chambers created by P. nidificator nymphs for their own reproduction, killing sheltering host nymphs. After its embryos have reached the second instar within the chamber, the female P. melanopygus will deposit its egg sac near a non-reproductive female P. nidificator, which will begin to care-take the parasitic offspring. Parasitic nymphs are reliant on P. nidificator to be fed and can stimulate feeding using vibrations. P. melanopygus nymphs further parasitize P. nidificator by hijacking its molt chambers for their own ecdysis. Despite their tiny size relative to their host (reaching only 2mm), adult and nymphal P. melanopygus will directly predate P. nidificator nymphs when they are vulnerable following a molt. Otherwise, P. melanopygus is unable to engage in its own prey-capture and is entirely reliant upon its host to be fed.

P. melanopygus significantly reduces the survivorship of the P. nidificator colonies they infest and are a relatively common parasite in Minas Gerais, Brazil, where they were found in 16% of colonies.
