= Afrosternophorus hirsti =

Scientific classification
- Kingdom: Animalia
- Phylum: Arthropoda
- Subphylum: Chelicerata
- Class: Arachnida
- Order: Pseudoscorpiones
- Family: Sternophoridae
- Genus: Afrosternophorus
- Species: A. hirsti

Binomial name
- Afrosternophorus hirsti (Chamberlin, 1932)

Synonyms
- Sternophorus hirsti Chamberlin, 1932

Species of pseudoscorpion

Afrosternophorus hirsti is a species of pseudoscorpion in the Sternophoridae family. It was described in 1932 by American arachnologist Joseph Conrad Chamberlin. The specific epithet honours Dr F. S. Hirst who collected the holotype.

== Description ==
The body length of males is 2.0–2.3 mm; that of females 1.8–2.9 mm.

== Distribution and habitat ==
The species occurs in New South Wales and Queensland. The type locality is Barringun, on the border between the two states. The pseudoscorpions are found under tree bark.

== Behaviour ==
The pseudoscorpions are terrestrial predators.
