= Feaella affinis =

Conservation status
- Least Concern (IUCN 3.1)

Scientific classification
- Kingdom: Animalia
- Phylum: Arthropoda
- Subphylum: Chelicerata
- Class: Arachnida
- Order: Pseudoscorpiones
- Family: Feaellidae
- Genus: Feaella
- Species: F. affinis

Binomial name
- Feaella affinis Hirst, 1911

Species of pseudoscorpion

Feaella affinis is a species of arachnid in the order Pseudoscorpiones. It is endemic to Seychelles, where it is known from the islands of Silhouette, Praslin, and La Digue.

This species lives in woodland habitat under leaf litter. Some of its habitat is degraded, but it is not considered to be of conservation concern.
