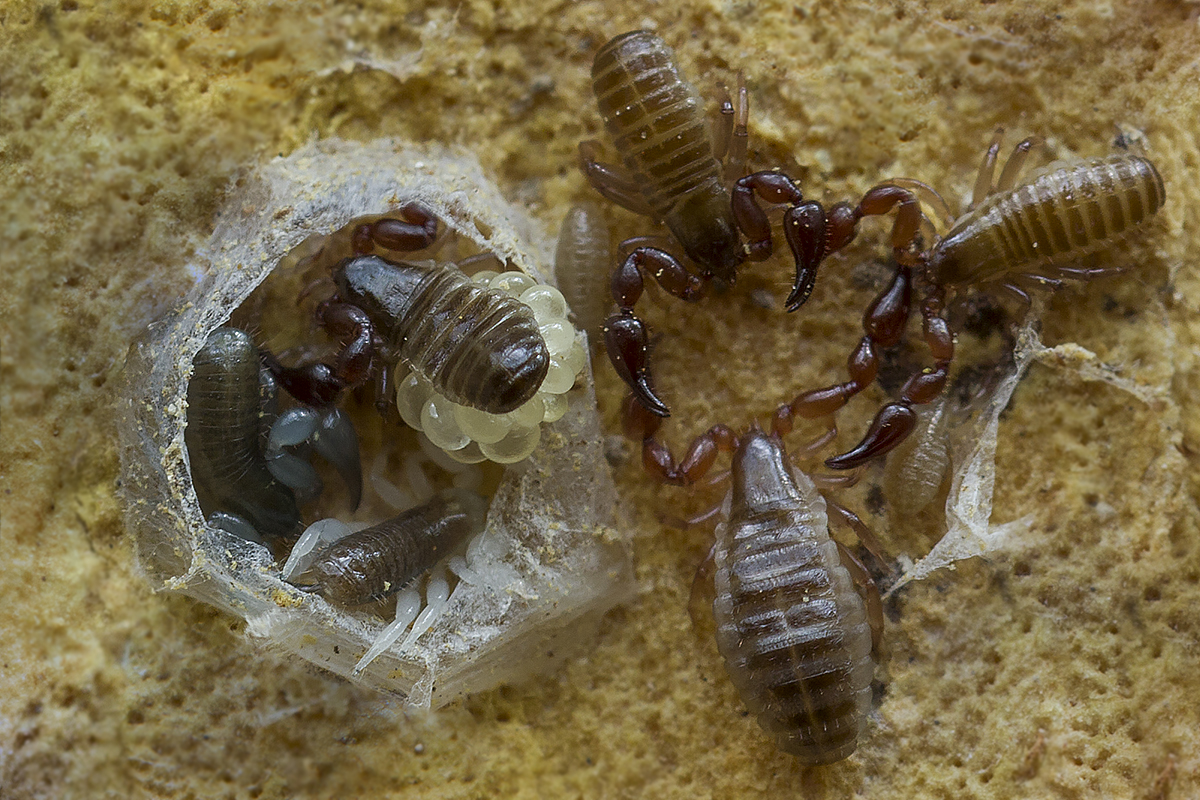
- Paratemnoides nidificator

Scientific classification
- Kingdom: Animalia
- Phylum: Arthropoda
- Subphylum: Chelicerata
- Class: Arachnida
- Order: Pseudoscorpiones
- Family: Atemnidae
- Genus: Paratemnoides; Harvey, 1991

Type species
- Chelifer (Atemnus) guineensis Ellingsen, 1906

Synonyms
- Paratemnus Beier, 1932

= Paratemnoides =

Genus of pseudoscorpions

Paratemnoides is a genus of pseudoscorpions in the Atemnidae family. It was described in 1991 by Australian arachnologist Mark Harvey.

== Species ==
The genus contains the following species:

- Paratemnoides aequatorialis (Beier, 1932)
- Paratemnoides assimilis (Beier, 1932)
- Paratemnoides borneoensis (Beier, 1932)
- Paratemnoides curtulus (Redikorzev, 1938)
- Paratemnoides ellingseni (Beier, 1932)
- Paratemnoides feai (Ellingsen, 1906)
- Paratemnoides indicus (Sivaraman, 1980)
- Paratemnoides indivisus (Tullgren, 1907)
- Paratemnoides insubidus (Tullgren, 1907)
- Paratemnoides japonicus (Morikawa, 1953)
- Paratemnoides laosanus (Beier, 1951)
- Paratemnoides magnificus (Beier, 1932)
- Paratemnoides mahnerti (Sivaraman, 1981)
- Paratemnoides minutissimus (Beier, 1974)
- Paratemnoides nidificator (Balzan, 1888)
- Paratemnoides obscurus (Beier, 1959)
- Paratemnoides pallidus (Balzan, 1892)
- Paratemnoides perpusillus (Beier, 1935)
- Paratemnoides persimilis (Beier, 1932)
- Paratemnoides philippinus (Beier, 1932)
- Paratemnoides plebejus (With, 1906)
- Paratemnoides pococki (With, 1907)
- Paratemnoides redikorzevi (Beier, 1951)
- Paratemnoides robustus (Beier, 1932)
- Paratemnoides salomonis (Beier, 1935)
  - Paratemnoides salomonis hebridicus (Beier, 1940)
  - Paratemnoides salomonis salomonis (Beier, 1935)
- Paratemnoides sinensis (Beier, 1932)
- Paratemnoides singularis (Beier, 1965)
- Paratemnoides sumatranus (Beier, 1935)
