= Feaella perreti =

Scientific classification
- Domain: Eukaryota
- Kingdom: Animalia
- Phylum: Arthropoda
- Subphylum: Chelicerata
- Class: Arachnida
- Order: Pseudoscorpiones
- Family: Feaellidae
- Genus: Feaella
- Species: F. perreti

Binomial name
- Feaella perreti Mahnert, 1982

Species of arachnid

Feaella perreti is a species of arachnid in the order Pseudoscorpiones in the family Feaellidae. It is endemic to Kenya.
