= Anatemnus seychellesensis =

Conservation status
- Endangered (IUCN 3.1)

Scientific classification
- Domain: Eukaryota
- Kingdom: Animalia
- Phylum: Arthropoda
- Subphylum: Chelicerata
- Class: Arachnida
- Order: Pseudoscorpiones
- Family: Atemnidae
- Genus: Anatemnus
- Species: A. seychellesensis

Binomial name
- Anatemnus seychellesensis Beier, 1940

Species of pseudoscorpion

Anatemnus seychellesensis is a species of pseudoscorpions that is endemic to the Seychelles, and is known from a single specimen from Silhouette Island. It is threatened by habitat degradation from invasive plants and coastal development.
