= Beierobisium oppositum =

Scientific classification
- Kingdom: Animalia
- Phylum: Arthropoda
- Subphylum: Chelicerata
- Class: Arachnida
- Order: Pseudoscorpiones
- Family: Gymnobisiidae
- Genus: Beierobisium
- Species: B. oppositum

Binomial name
- Beierobisium oppositum Vitali-di Castri, 1970

Species of pseudoscorpion

Beierobisium oppositum is a species of pseudoscorpion from the family Gymnobisiidae. They are found in the Falkland Islands and often live in tussock grass. It is the type species of the genus Beierobisium.
