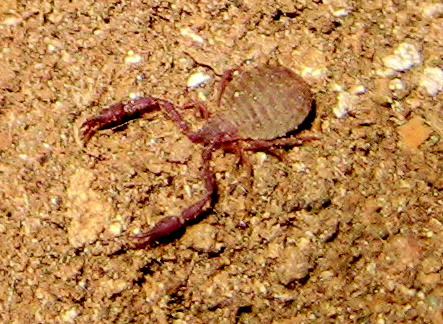

Scientific classification
- Kingdom: Animalia
- Phylum: Arthropoda
- Subphylum: Chelicerata
- Class: Arachnida
- Order: Pseudoscorpiones
- Family: Larcidae
- Genus: Larca
- Species: L. boulderica

Binomial name
- Larca boulderica Harvey & Steinmann, 2024

= Larca boulderica =

Species of pseudoscorpions

Larca boulderica is a species of pseudoscorpion of the family Larcidae.

== Distribution ==
This species is endemic to Boulder, Colorado in the United States. It was found in Mallory Cave at the eastern edge of the Rocky Mountains.

== Description ==
The species has crab-like pincers and is the size of a sesame seed.

== Etymology ==
The species is named after the city it was first discovered in: Boulder, Colorado.
