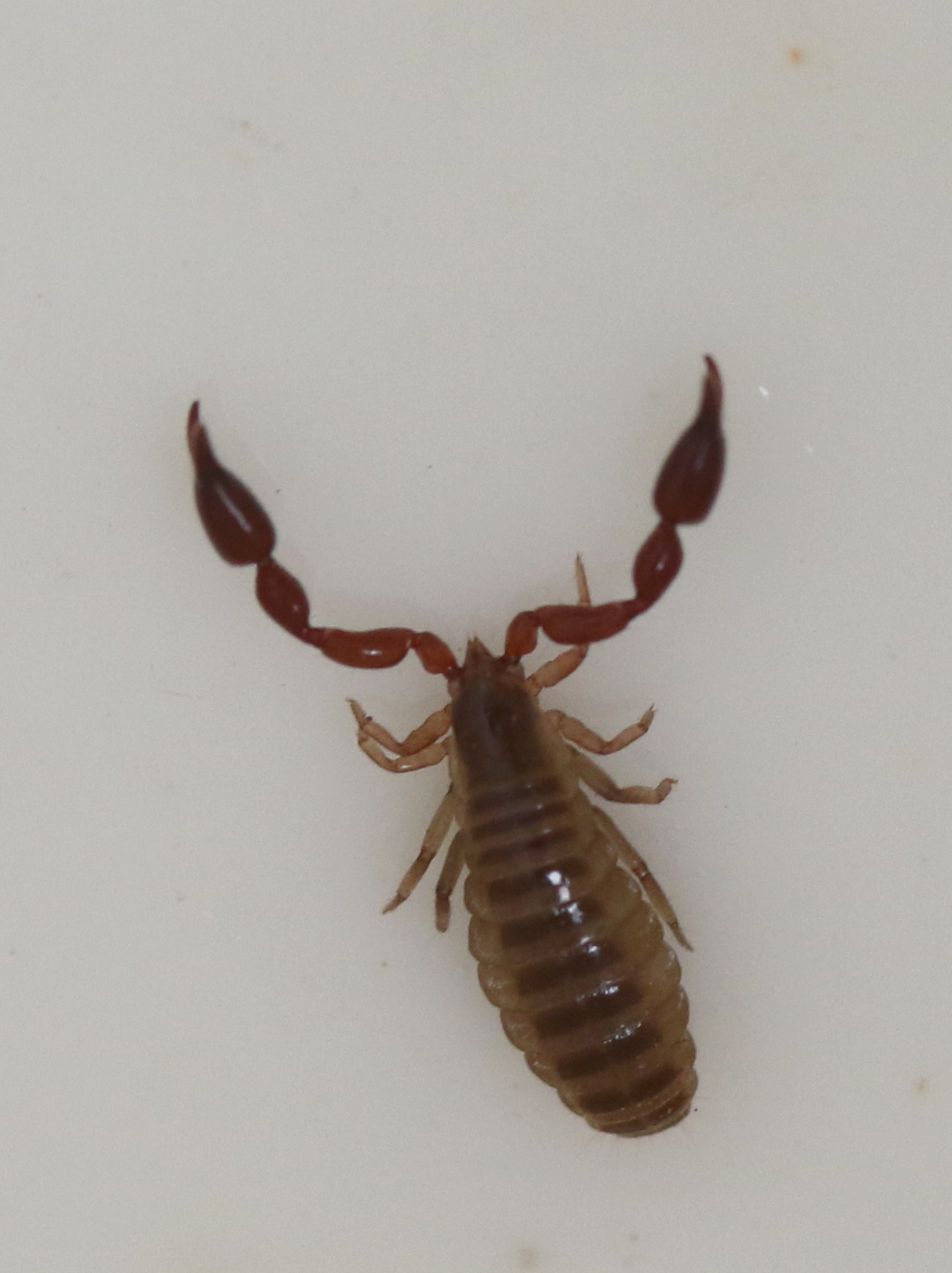
- Oratemnus sp. New South Wales

Scientific classification
- Domain: Eukaryota
- Kingdom: Animalia
- Phylum: Arthropoda
- Subphylum: Chelicerata
- Class: Arachnida
- Order: Pseudoscorpiones
- Family: Atemnidae
- Genus: Oratemnus; Beier, 1932

Species
- See text

= Oratemnus =

Genus of pseudoscorpions

Oratemnus is a genus of pseudoscorpions in the family Atemnidae.

== Species ==
The genus contains the following species:

- Oratemnus afghanicus Beier, 1959
- Oratemnus articulosus (Simon, 1899)
- Oratemnus boettcheri Beier, 1932
- Oratemnus brevidigitatus Beier, 1940
- Oratemnus cavernicola Beier, 1976
- Oratemnus confusus Murthy & Ananthakrishnan, 1977
- Oratemnus curtus (Beier, 1954)
- Oratemnus distinctus (Beier, 1948)
- Oratemnus indicus (With, 1906)
- Oratemnus loyolai Sivaraman, 1980
- Oratemnus manilanus Beier, 1932
- Oratemnus navigator (With, 1906)
- Oratemnus philippinensis Beier, 1932
- Oratemnus proximus Beier, 1932
- Oratemnus punctatus (L. Koch & Keyserling, 1885)
- Oratemnus saigonensis (Beier, 1930)
- Oratemnus samoanus Beier, 1932
- Oratemnus semidivisus Redikorzev, 1938
- Oratemnus timorensis Beier, 1932
- Oratemnus yodai Morikawa, 1968
