= Titanatemnus thomeensis =

Scientific classification
- Domain: Eukaryota
- Kingdom: Animalia
- Phylum: Arthropoda
- Subphylum: Chelicerata
- Class: Arachnida
- Order: Pseudoscorpiones
- Family: Atemnidae
- Genus: Titanatemnus
- Species: T. thomeensis

Binomial name
- Titanatemnus thomeensis (Ellingsen, 1906)

Synonyms
- Chelifer sjoestedti thomeensis Ellingsen, 1906

Species of scorpion

Titanatemnus thomeensis is an endemic pseudoscorpion species of the family Atemnidae that lives on São Tomé Island. It was first described in 1906 by Edvard Ellingsen.
