= Thenmus =

Scientific classification
- Kingdom: Animalia
- Phylum: Arthropoda
- Subphylum: Chelicerata
- Class: Arachnida
- Order: Pseudoscorpiones
- Family: Menthidae
- Genus: Thenmus; Harvey, 1990

Type species
- Thenmus aigialites Harvey, 1990

Genus of pseudoscorpions

Thenmus is a genus of pseudoscorpions in the Menthidae family. It is endemic to Australia and was described in 1990 by Australian arachnologist Mark Harvey.

== Species ==
The genus contains the following species:

- Thenmus aigialites Harvey, 1990
- Thenmus augustus Harvey, 2006
