= Oratemnus curtus =

Scientific classification
- Kingdom: Animalia
- Phylum: Arthropoda
- Subphylum: Chelicerata
- Class: Arachnida
- Order: Pseudoscorpiones
- Family: Atemnidae
- Genus: Oratemnus
- Species: O. curtus

Binomial name
- Oratemnus curtus (Beier, 1954)

Synonyms
- Steiratemnus curtus Beier, 1954

Species of pseudoscorpion

Oratemnus curtus is a species of pseudoscorpion in the Atemnidae family. It is endemic to Australia. It was described in 1954 by Austrian arachnologist Max Beier.

== Distribution and habitat ==
The species occurs in south-west Western Australia. The type locality is Burma Road, Pemberton. The pseudoscorpions were found under bark in woodland.

== Behaviour ==
The pseudoscorpions are terrestrial predators.
