= Afrogarypus seychellesensis =

Conservation status
- Critically endangered, possibly extinct (IUCN 3.1)

Scientific classification
- Domain: Eukaryota
- Kingdom: Animalia
- Phylum: Arthropoda
- Subphylum: Chelicerata
- Class: Arachnida
- Order: Pseudoscorpiones
- Family: Geogarypidae
- Genus: Afrogarypus
- Species: A. seychellesensis

Binomial name
- Afrogarypus seychellesensis (Beier, 1940)

Species of pseudoscorpion

Afrogarypus seychellesensis is a species of pseudoscorpions that is endemic to Praslin in the Seychelles. It is only known from its type specimen, and has not been seen since. If it is still extant, it would be threatened by the habitat deterioration caused by invasive plants.
