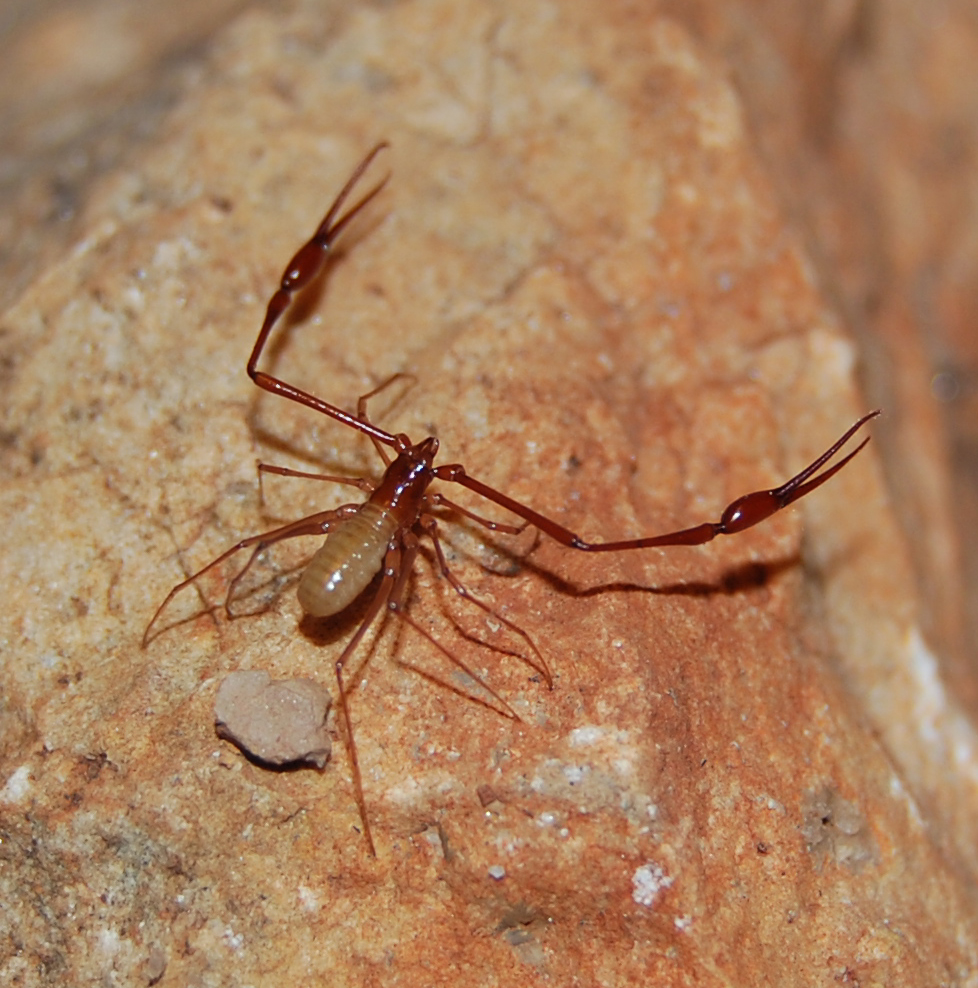

Scientific classification
- Domain: Eukaryota
- Kingdom: Animalia
- Phylum: Arthropoda
- Subphylum: Chelicerata
- Class: Arachnida
- Order: Pseudoscorpiones
- Family: Bochicidae
- Subfamily: Bochicinae
- Genus: Titanobochica; Zaragoza & Reboleira, 2010
- Species: T. magna

Binomial name
- Titanobochica magna Zaragoza & Reboleira, 2010

= Titanobochica =

Genus of pseudoscorpions

Titanobochica is a monotypic genus of pseudoscorpion in the family Bochicidae. It contains the single species Titanobochica magna, a cave-dwelling pseudoscorpion native to caves in the Algarve region of Portugal.

== Description ==
Titanobochica magna is unpigmented and does not have eyes. Like all members of its family, it is venomous.

== Distribution and habitat ==
The species is endemic to caves of the Algarve karstic massif.
