= Afrosternophorus =

Scientific classification
- Kingdom: Animalia
- Phylum: Arthropoda
- Subphylum: Chelicerata
- Class: Arachnida
- Order: Pseudoscorpiones
- Family: Sternophoridae
- Genus: Afrosternophorus; Beier, 1967

Type species
- Sternophorus (Afrosternophorus) aethiopicus Beier, 1967

Synonyms
- Sternophorellus Beier, 1971; Indogaryops Sivaraman, 1981

Genus of pseudoscorpions

Afrosternophorus is a genus of pseudoscorpions in the Sternophoridae family. It was described in 1967 by Austrian arachnologist Max Beier.

== Species ==
The genus contains the following species:

- Afrosternophorus aethiopicus (Beier, 1967)
- Afrosternophorus anabates Harvey, 1985
- Afrosternophorus araucariae (Beier, 1971)
- Afrosternophorus cavernae (Beier, 1982)
- Afrosternophorus ceylonicus (Beier, 1973)
- Afrosternophorus chamberlini (Redikorzev, 1938)
- Afrosternophorus cylindrimanus (Beier, 1951)
- Afrosternophorus dawydoffi (Beier, 1951)
- Afrosternophorus fallax Harvey, 1985
- Afrosternophorus grayi (Beier, 1971)
- Afrosternophorus hirsti (Chamberlin, 1932)
- Afrosternophorus longus Mathew and Joseph, 2021
- Afrosternophorus nanus Harvey, 1985
- Afrosternophorus papuanus (Beier, 1975)
- Afrosternophorus xalyx Harvey, 1985
