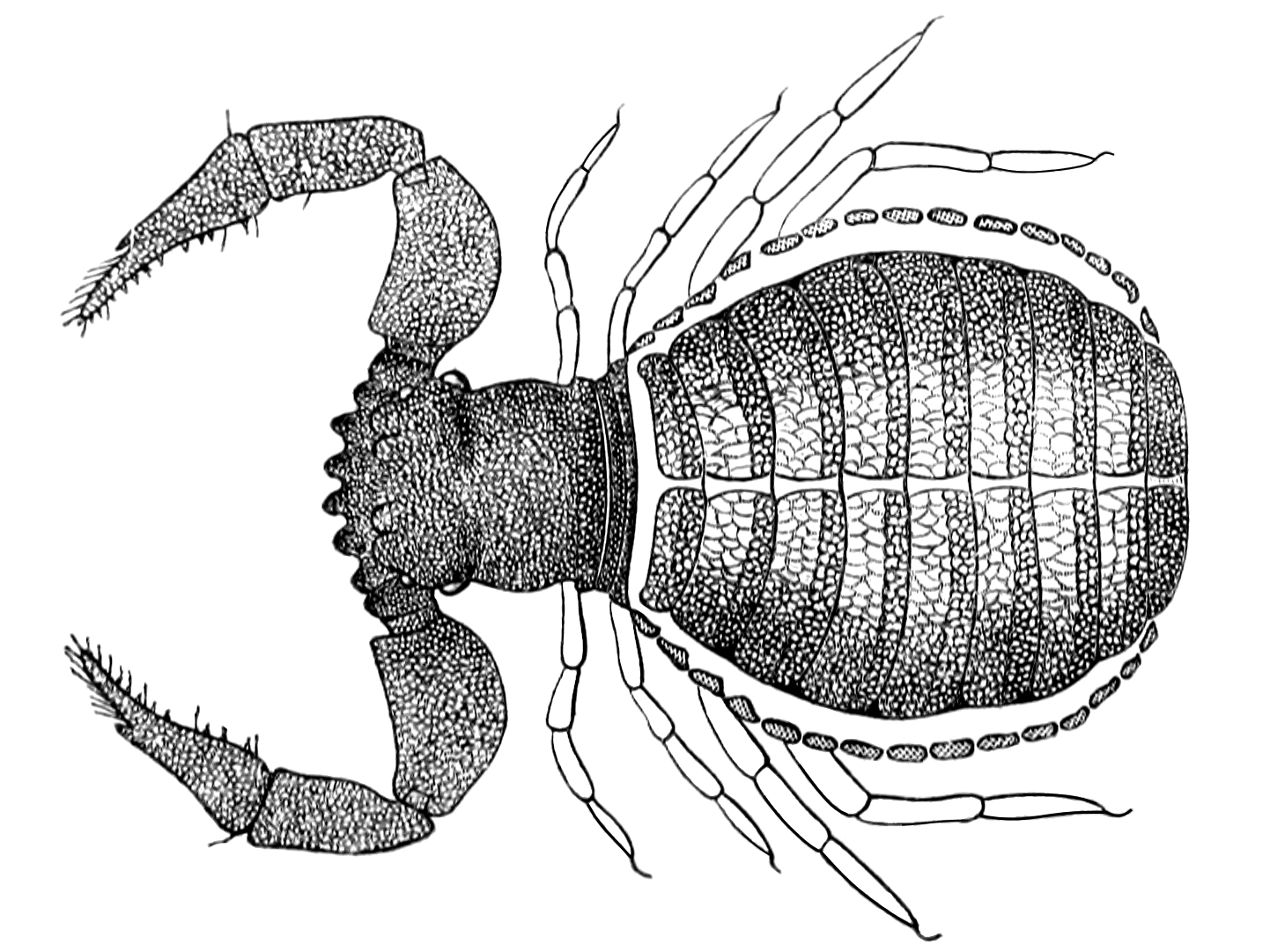

Scientific classification
- Domain: Eukaryota
- Kingdom: Animalia
- Phylum: Arthropoda
- Subphylum: Chelicerata
- Class: Arachnida
- Order: Pseudoscorpiones
- Family: Feaellidae
- Genus: Feaella; Ellingsen, 1906

Type species
- Feaella mirabilis Ellingsen, 1906

Species
- 18, see text

= Feaella =

Genus of pseudoscorpions

Feaella is a genus of pseudoscorpions in the family Feaellidae, first described by Edvard Ellingsen in 1906.

== Species ==
As of October 2023, the World Pseudoscorpiones Catalog accepted the following eighteen species:

- Feaella affinis Hirst, 1911
- Feaella anderseni Harvey, 1989
- Feaella callani Harvey, Abrams, Beavis, Hillyer & Huey, 2016
- Feaella capensis Beier, 1955
- Feaella indica Chamberlin, 1931
- Feaella jocquei Henderickx, 2009
- Feaella krugeri Beier, 1966
- Feaella leleupi Beier, 1959
- Feaella linetteae Harvey, Abrams, Beavis, Hillyer & Huey, 2016
- Feaella mirabilis Ellingsen, 1906
- Feaella mombasica Beier, 1955
- Feaella mucronata Tullgren, 1907
- Feaella nana (Beier, 1966)
- Feaella obscura Novák, Lorenz & Harms, 2020
- Feaella parva Beier, 1947
- Feaella perreti Mahnert, 1982
- Feaella tealei Harvey, Abrams, Beavis, Hillyer & Huey, 2016
