= Anatemnus cavernicola =

Scientific classification
- Kingdom: Animalia
- Phylum: Arthropoda
- Subphylum: Chelicerata
- Class: Arachnida
- Order: Pseudoscorpiones
- Family: Atemnidae
- Genus: Anatemnus
- Species: A. cavernicola

Binomial name
- Anatemnus cavernicola (Beier, 1976)

Synonyms
- Oratemnus cavernicola Beier, 1976

Species of pseudoscorpion

Anatemnus cavernicola is a species of pseudoscorpion in the Atemnidae family. It is endemic to Australia. It was described in 1976 by Austrian arachnologist Max Beier. The specific epithet cavernicola ('cave-dwelling') refers to the species’ habitat.

== Description ==
The body length of the female holotype is 5 mm. The carapace is smooth reddish-brown in front, pale yellowish behind. Eyes are absent.

== Distribution and habitat ==
The species occurs in far north-western New South Wales in the Channel Country bioregion. The type locality is Jump-Up Cave in the Grey Range, about 48 km north of Tibooburra. The holotype was found in dung 3 m inside the cave.

== Behaviour ==
The pseudoscorpions are cave dwelling, terrestrial predators.
