= Parahya =

Scientific classification
- Kingdom: Animalia
- Phylum: Arthropoda
- Subphylum: Chelicerata
- Class: Arachnida
- Order: Pseudoscorpiones
- Superfamily: Neobisioidea
- Family: Parahyidae; Harvey, 1992
- Genus: Parahya; Beier, 1957
- Species: P. submersa

Binomial name
- Parahya submersa (Bristowe, 1931)

Synonyms
- Obisium submersum Parahya pacifica

Genus of pseudoscorpions

Parahya submersa is a species of pseudoscorpion that resides within the monotypic family Parahyidae.

== Distribution and habitat ==
The species occurs in Singapore, Sulawesi, Micronesia, New Caledonia and northern Australia.
