= Titanatemnus =

Maltecora

Scientific classification
- Kingdom: Animalia
- Phylum: Arthropoda
- Subphylum: Chelicerata
- Class: Arachnida
- Order: Pseudoscorpiones
- Family: Atemnidae
- Subfamily: Atemninae
- Genus: Titanatemnus; Beier, 1932

Species
- See text

Genus of pseudoscorpions

Titanatemnus is a pseudoscorpion genus of the Atemnidae.

== Species ==
Source: Pseudoscorpions of the World 2.0:

- Titanatemnus alluaudi Vachon, 1935
- Titanatemnus chappuisi Beier, 1935
- Titanatemnus congicus Beier, 1932
- Titanatemnus conradti (Tullgren, 1908)
- Titanatemnus coreophilus Beier, 1948
- Titanatemnus equester (With, 1905)
- Titanatemnus gigas Beier, 1932
- Titanatemnus kibwezianus Beier, 1932
- Titanatemnus monardi Vachon, 1935
- Titanatemnus natalensis Beier, 1932
- Titanatemnus orientalis Beier, 1932
- Titanatemnus palmquisti (Tullgren, 1907)
- Titanatemnus regneri Beier, 1932
- Titanatemnus saegeri Beier, 1972
- Titanatemnus serrulatus Beier, 1932
- Titanatemnus similis Beier, 1932
- Titanatemnus sjoestedti (Tullgren, 1901)
- Titanatemnus tanensis Mahnert, 1983
- Titanatemnus tessmanni Beier, 1932
- Titanatemnus thomeensis (Ellingsen, 1906)
- Titanatemnus ugandanus Beier, 1932
