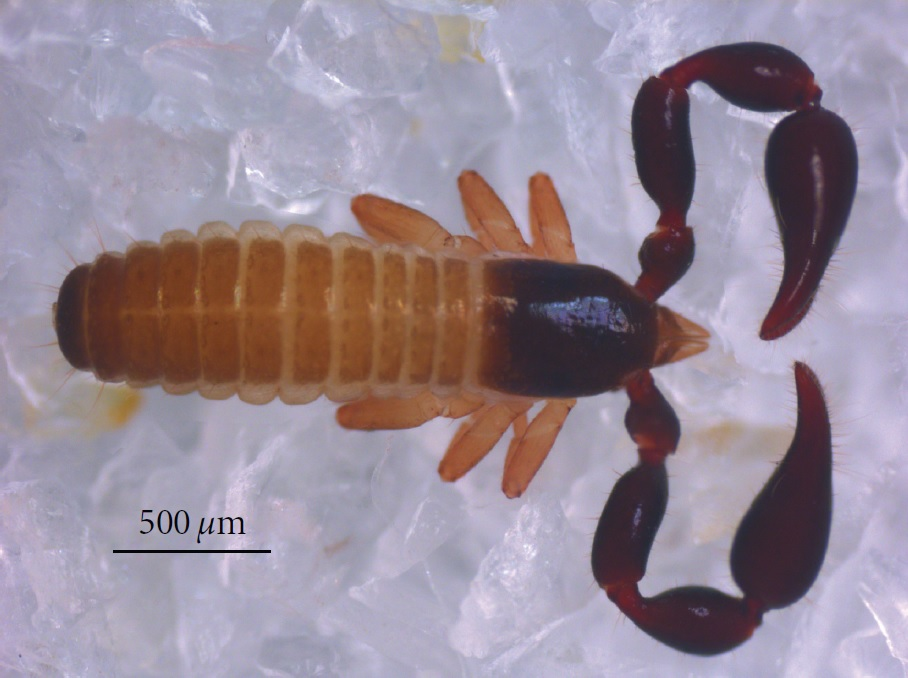
- Anatemnus chaozhouensis

Scientific classification
- Domain: Eukaryota
- Kingdom: Animalia
- Phylum: Arthropoda
- Subphylum: Chelicerata
- Class: Arachnida
- Order: Pseudoscorpiones
- Family: Atemnidae
- Genus: Anatemnus; Beier, 1932

Species
- See text

= Anatemnus =

Genus of pseudoscorpions

Anatemnus is a genus of pseudoscorpions in the Atemnidae family.

== Species ==
The genus contains the following species:

- Anatemnus angustus Redikorzev, 1938
- Anatemnus cavernicola (Beier, 1976)
- Anatemnus chaozhouensis Hu & Zhang, 2012
- Anatemnus elongatus (Ellingsen, 1902)
- Anatemnus javanus (Thorell, 1883)
- Anatemnus luzonicus Beier, 1932
- Anatemnus madecassus Beier, 1932
- Anatemnus megasoma (Daday, 1897)
- Anatemnus nilgiricus Beier, 1932
- Anatemnus novaguineensis (With, 1908)
- Anatemnus orites (Thorell, 1889)
- Anatemnus oswaldi (Tullgren, 1907)
- Anatemnus pugilatorius Beier, 1965
- Anatemnus reni Gao & Zhang, 2016
- Anatemnus rotundus (With, 1906)
- Anatemnus seychellesensis Beier, 1940
- Anatemnus subindicus (Ellingsen, 1910)
- Anatemnus subvastus Alexander, Burger & Harvey, 2014
- Anatemnus subvermiformis Redikorzev, 1938
- Anatemnus tonkinensis Beier, 1943
- Anatemnus vermiformis (With, 1906)
- Anatemnus voeltzkowi (Ellingsen, 1908)
- Anatemnus wongalara Harvey & Cullen, 2021
- Anatemnus longus Beier, 1932 is a synonym of Anatemnus voeltzkowi (With, 1906).
