= Pseudochiridium =

Scientific classification
- Kingdom: Animalia
- Phylum: Arthropoda
- Subphylum: Chelicerata
- Class: Arachnida
- Order: Pseudoscorpiones
- Family: Pseudochiridiidae
- Genus: Pseudochiridium; With, 1906

Type species
- Pseudochiridium thorelli With, 1906

Synonyms
- Afrocheiridium Beier, 1932

Genus of pseudoscorpions

Pseudochiridium is a genus of pseudoscorpions in the Pseudochiridiidae family. It was described in 1906 by Danish arachnologist Carl Johannes With.

== Species ==
The genus contains the following species:

- Pseudochiridium africanum Beier, 1944
- Pseudochiridium clavigerum (Thorell, 1889)
- Pseudochiridium heurtaultae Vitali-di Castri, 1970
- Pseudochiridium insulae Hoff, 1964
- Pseudochiridium kenyense Mahnert, 1982
- Pseudochiridium lawrencei Beier, 1964
- Pseudochiridium minutissimum Beier, 1959
- Pseudochiridium thorelli With, 1906
- Pseudochiridium traegardhi Tullgren, 1907
- Pseudochiridium triquetrum Beier, 1965
- Pseudochiridium vachoni (Vitali-di Castri, 1970)

=== Fossil species ===
- †Pseudochiridium lindae Judson, 2007
