= Afrogarypus =

Scientific classification
- Domain: Eukaryota
- Kingdom: Animalia
- Phylum: Arthropoda
- Subphylum: Chelicerata
- Class: Arachnida
- Order: Pseudoscorpiones
- Family: Geogarypidae
- Genus: Afrogarypus; Beier, 1931

Species
- See text

Genus of pseudoscorpions

Afrogarypus is a genus of pseudoscorpions, which contains the following species:

- Afrogarypus basilewskyi
- Afrogarypus curtus
- Afrogarypus excelsus
- Afrogarypus excelsus excellens
- Afrogarypus excelsus excelsus
- Afrogarypus impressus
- Afrogarypus intermedius intermedius
- Afrogarypus intermedius nanus
- Afrogarypus monticola
- Afrogarypus plumatus
- Afrogarypus pseudocurtus
- Afrogarypus rhodesiacus
- Afrogarypus senegalensis
- Afrogarypus seychellesensis
- Afrogarypus stellifer
- Afrogarypus subimpressus
- Afrogarypus sulcatus
- Afrogarypus zonatus
