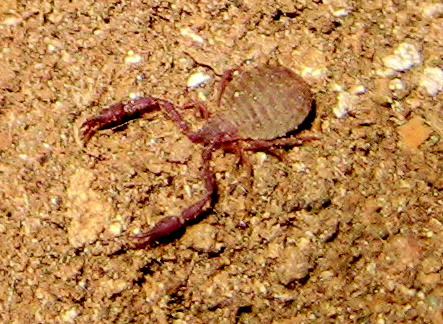
- Larca boulderica

Scientific classification
- Kingdom: Animalia
- Phylum: Arthropoda
- Subphylum: Chelicerata
- Class: Arachnida
- Order: Pseudoscorpiones
- Family: Larcidae; Harvey, 1992
- Genus: Larca; J. C. Chamberlin, 1930

Synonyms
- Genus synonymy: Archeolarca Hoff & Clawson, 1952

= Larca =

Larca Temporal range: Cretaceous–present

Genus of pseudoscorpions

Larca is a genus of pseudoscorpions. It is the only genus in the family Larcidae. They are found in North America and Europe.

== List of species ==
According to Pseudoscorpions of the World (version 3.0), Larcidae consists of the following species:

- Larca bosselaersi Henderickx & Vets, 2002
- Larca chamberlini Benedict & Malcolm, 1978
- Larca fortunata Zaragoza, 2005
- Larca granulata (Banks, 1891)
- Larca hispanica Beier, 1939
- Larca italica Gardini, 1983
- Larca laceyi Muchmore, 1981
- Larca lata (Hansen, 1884)
- Larca lucentina Zaragoza, 2005
- Larca notha Hoff, 1961

The following species have been placed in the family since then:

- Larca aalbui (Muchmore, 1984)
- Larca cavicola (Muchmore, 1981)
- Larca guadalupensis (Muchmore, 1981)
- Larca rotunda (Hoff & Clawson, 1952)
- Larca welbourni (Muchmore, 1981)
- Larca boulderica Harvey & Steinmann, 2024

In 2014, Harvey and Wynne placed the genus Archeolarca in synonymy with Larca.

== Biography ==
- Chamberlin, 1930 : A synoptic classification of the false scorpions or chela-spinners, with a report on a cosmopolitan collection of the same. Part II. The Diplosphyronida (Arachnida-Chelonethida). Annals and Magazine of Natural History, series 10, vol. 5, p. 1-48 & 585-620.
- Harvey, 1992 : The phylogeny and classification of the Pseudoscorpionida (Chelicerata: Arachnida). Invertebrate Taxonomy, vol. 6, p. 1373-1435.
