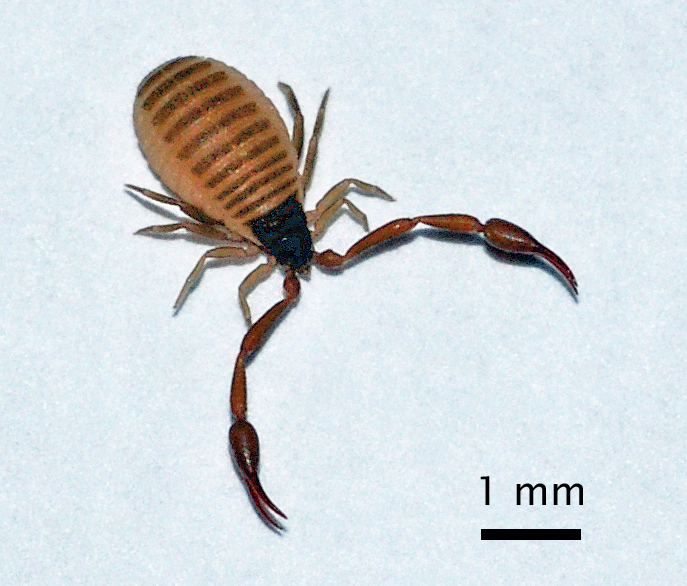
- Chelifer cancroides, family Cheliferidae

Scientific classification
- Domain: Eukaryota
- Kingdom: Animalia
- Phylum: Arthropoda
- Subphylum: Chelicerata
- Class: Arachnida
- Order: Pseudoscorpiones
- Suborder: Iocheirata
- Superfamily: Cheliferoidea; Risso, 1826

Families
- See text

= Cheliferoidea =

Cheliferoidea Temporal range: Cretaceous–present

Superfamily of pseudoscorpions

The Cheliferoidea are a superfamily of pseudoscorpions.

== Families ==
The superfamily contains the following families:

- Atemnidae Kishida, 1929 (Chamberlin, 1931?)
- Miratemnidae (Sometimes considered a subfamily of Atemnidae, Miratemninae)
- Myrmochernetidae Chamberlin, 1931 (Junior synonym of Chernetidae)
- Chernetidae Menge, 1855
- Withiidae Chamberlin, 1931
- Cheliferidae Risso, 1826
