= Bochicidae =

Scientific classification
- Kingdom: Animalia
- Phylum: Arthropoda
- Subphylum: Chelicerata
- Class: Arachnida
- Order: Pseudoscorpiones
- Family: Bochicidae; Chamberlin, 1930

Family of pseudoscorpions

Bochicidae is a family of pseudoscorpions distributed throughout the Americas from Texas and Mexico to South America, from the Antilles to Venezuela, Guyana and Brazil, as well as in Europe (Iberian Peninsula). Members of the family can be diagnosed mainly by features of the claws, notably the presence of exactly 12 trichobothria on each claw (members of other similar families possess many more) and a long, as opposed to short, venom duct. Some species live in caves while some are surface-dwelling.

== Genera ==
As of October 2023, the World Pseudoscorpiones Catalog accepts the following twelve genera:

- Antillobisium Dumitresco & Orghidan, 1977
- Apohya Muchmore, 1973
- Bochica Chamberlin, 1930
- Leucohya Chamberlin, 1946
- Mexobisium Muchmore, 1972
- Paravachonium Beier, 1956
- Spelaeobochica Mahnert, 2001
- Titanobochica Zaragoza & Reboleira, 2010
- Troglobisium Beier, 1939
- Troglobochica Muchmore, 1984
- Troglohya Beier, 1956
- Vachonium Chamberlin, 1947
