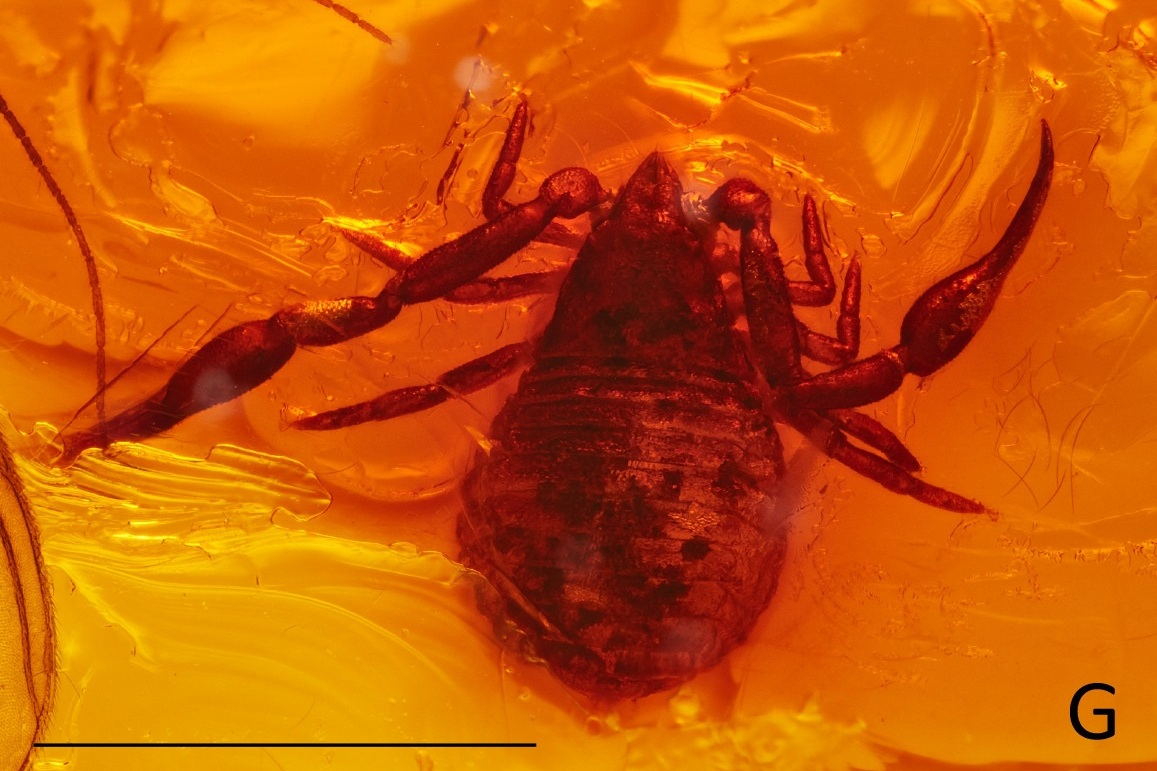
- Geogarypus macrodactylus in amber

Scientific classification
- Kingdom: Animalia
- Phylum: Arthropoda
- Subphylum: Chelicerata
- Class: Arachnida
- Order: Pseudoscorpiones
- Family: Geogarypidae
- Genus: Geogarypus; Chamberlin, 1930

Type species
- Garypus minor L.Koch, 1873

= Geogarypus =

Genus of pseudoscorpions

Geogarypus is a genus of pseudoscorpions in the Geogarypidae family. It was described in 1930 by American arachnologist Joseph Conrad Chamberlin. The genus has a cosmopolitan distribution.

== Species ==
As of October 2023, the World Pseudoscorpiones Catalog accepted the following species:

- Geogarypus albus Beier, 1963
- Geogarypus amazonicus Mahnert, 1979
- Geogarypus angulatus Chamberlin, 1930
- Geogarypus asiaticus Murthy & Ananthakrishnan, 1977
- Geogarypus azerbaidzhanicus Dashdamirov, 1993
- Geogarypus bucculentus Beier, 1955
- Geogarypus canariensis (Tullgren, 1900)
- Geogarypus ceylonicus Beier, 1973
- Geogarypus connatus Harvey, 1986
- Geogarypus continentalis (Redikorzev, 1934)
- Geogarypus cuyabanus (Balzan, 1887)
- Geogarypus deceptor Neethling & Haddad, 2016
- Geogarypus elegans (With, 1906)
- Geogarypus exochus Harvey, 1986
- Geogarypus facetus Cullen & Harvey, 2021
- Geogarypus fiebrigi Beier, 1931
- Geogarypus flavus Beier, 1947
- Geogarypus formosus (Mello-Leitão, 1937)
- Geogarypus globulus Sivaraman, 1980
- Geogarypus granulatus Murthy & Ananthakrishnan, 1977
- Geogarypus harveyi Nassirkhani, 2014
- Geogarypus heterodentatus Murthy & Ananthakrishnan, 1977
- Geogarypus incertus Caporiacco, 1947
- Geogarypus indicus (Beier, 1930)
- Geogarypus irrugatus (Simon, 1899)
- Geogarypus italicus Gardini, Galli & Zinni, 2017
- Geogarypus klarae Novák & Harvey, 2018
- Geogarypus liomendontus Neethling & Haddad, 2016
- Geogarypus longidigitatus (Rainbow, 1897)
- Geogarypus maculatus (With, 1907)
- Geogarypus maroccanus Beier, 1961
- Geogarypus minor (L. Koch, 1873)
- Geogarypus mirei Heurtault, 1970
- Geogarypus modjadji Neethling & Haddad, 2016
- Geogarypus muchmorei Novák & Harvey, 2018
- Geogarypus nepalensis Beier, 1974
- Geogarypus ocellatus Mahnert, 1978
- Geogarypus octoramosus Neethling & Haddad, 2016
- Geogarypus olivaceus (Tullgren, 1907)
- Geogarypus palauanus Beier, 1957
- Geogarypus paraguayanus Beier, 1931
- Geogarypus pisinnus Harvey, 1986
- Geogarypus plusculus Cullen & Harvey, 2021
- Geogarypus pulcher Beier, 1963
- Geogarypus pustulatus Beier, 1959
- Geogarypus rhantus Harvey, 1981
- Geogarypus sagittatus Beier, 1965
- Geogarypus shulovi Beier, 1963
- Geogarypus taylori Harvey, 1986
- Geogarypus tectomaculatus Neethling & Haddad, 2016
- Geogarypus tenuis Chamberlin, 1930
- Geogarypus variaspinosus Neethling & Haddad, 2016

=== Fossil species ===
- Geogarypus gorskii Henderickx, 2005
- Geogarypus macrodactylus Beier, 1937
- Geogarypus major Beier, 1937
