= Rum Jungle =

Australian group

Background information
- Origin: Newcastle, New South Wales, Australia
- Genres: Indie pop; indie rock
- Years active: 2017–present
- Label: Rum Jungle
- Members: Benny McIntyre; Josh Giles; Michael Kolmajer; Frazer McDonald
- Website: www.rumjungleband.com

Rum Jungle are an Australian indie rock group from Newcastle, New South Wales. The group released released four EPs before their debut studio album, Recency Bias, was released in February 2025.

== History ==
Rum Jungle were formed by Benny McIntyre (vocals and guitar), Josh Giles (guitar), Michael Kolmajer (bass guitar) and Frazer McDonald (drums) and released their debut extended plays Crazy Days (2017) and Sun & Smoke (2018). In 2018, Ben McIntyre said: "We love the first EP, but this (Sun & Smoke) had a lot more put into it creatively from all four of us. All four of us have become far better at music in general and writing. Playing live as well, has really helped with writing and figuring out what’s fun to play and for people to listen to."

In 2022, the group released their third EP Everything Is Easy, which was followed in November 2023 with Hold Me in the Water; their first released on vinyl.

In October 2024, the group announced the released of their debut studio album Recency Bias. It was released in February 2025.

== Discography ==
=== Albums ===
List of albums, with selected details
Title	Details	Peak chart positions	
Title	Details	AUS	NZ
Recency Bias	Released: 21 February 2025; Format: CD, LP, digital; Label: Rum Jungle (RUMJ009D)	9	—
Marginalia	Released: 5 June 2026; Format: CD, LP, digital; Label: Rum Jungle	19	10

=== Extended plays ===
List of EPs, with selected details
Title	EP details
Crazy Days	Released: 12 October 2017; Format: digital; Label: Rum Jungle
Sun & Smoke	Released: 25 August 2018; Format: digital; Label: Rum Jungle
Everything Is Easy	Released: 31 May 2022; Format: digital; Label: Rum Jungle
Hold Me in the Water	Released: 10 November 2023; Format: LP, digital; Label: Rum Jungle
