= Pseudochiridiidae =

Scientific classification
- Kingdom: Animalia
- Phylum: Arthropoda
- Subphylum: Chelicerata
- Class: Arachnida
- Order: Pseudoscorpiones
- Family: Pseudochiridiidae; Chamberlin, 1923

Family of pseudoscorpions

Pseudochiridiidae is a family of pseudoscorpions. It was described in 1923 by American arachnologist Joseph Conrad Chamberlin. Pseudochiridiids are relatively small pseudoscorpions. They are found in plant litter or beneath tree bark. The family was sometimes treated as a subfamily of the Cheiridiidae, but has since been reinstated.

== Genera ==
The family contains the following genera:

- Paracheiridium Vachon, 1938
- Pseudochiridium With, 1906
