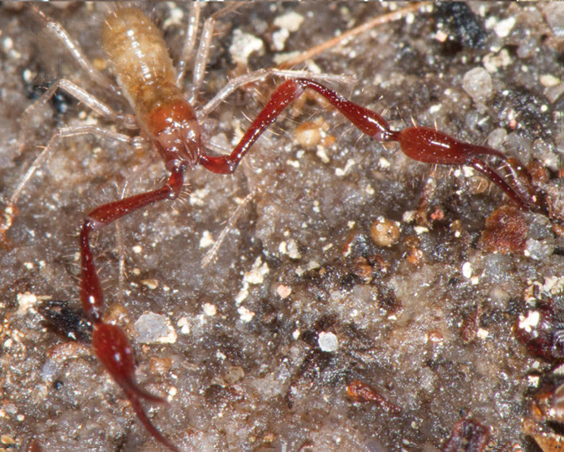
- A cave-dwelling Gymnobisium inukshuk

Scientific classification
- Kingdom: Animalia
- Phylum: Arthropoda
- Subphylum: Chelicerata
- Class: Arachnida
- Order: Pseudoscorpiones
- Superfamily: Neobisioidea
- Family: Gymnobisiidae; Beier, 1947

= Gymnobisiidae =

Family of pseudoscorpions

Gymnobisiidae is a family of pseudoscorpions found throughout South America and southern Africa. South Africa hosts eight distinct species including the troglobitic Gymnobisium inukshuk.

== Genera ==
- Beierobisium Vitali-di Castri, 1970
- Gymnobisium Beier, 1931
- Mirobisium Beier, 1931
- Vachonobisium Vitali-di Castri, 1963
