= Menthidae =

Scientific classification
- Kingdom: Animalia
- Phylum: Arthropoda
- Subphylum: Chelicerata
- Class: Arachnida
- Order: Pseudoscorpiones
- Superfamily: Garypoidea
- Family: Menthidae; Chamberlin, 1930

Family of pseudoscorpions

Menthidae is a family of pseudoscorpions, first described by Joseph Conrad Chamberlin in 1930.

== Genera ==
As of October 2023, the World Pseudoscorpiones Catalog accepted the following five genera:

- Menthus Chamberlin, 1930
- Oligomenthus Beier, 1962
- Paramenthus Beier, 1963
- Pseudomenthus Mahnert, 2007
- Thenmus Harvey, 1990
