= Sternophoridae =

Sternophoridae Temporal range: Neogene–present

Scientific classification
- Kingdom: Animalia
- Phylum: Arthropoda
- Subphylum: Chelicerata
- Class: Arachnida
- Order: Pseudoscorpiones
- Family: Sternophoridae; Chamberlin, 1923

Family of pseudoscorpions

The Sternophoridae are a family of pseudoscorpions with about 20 described species in three genera. While Afrosternophorus is an Old World genus, found mainly in Australasia (with, despite its name, only one African species), the other two genera are found in the New World, from El Salvador to the southern USA and in the Dominican Republic.

== Genera ==
As of October 2023, the World Pseudoscorpiones Catalog accepts the following three genera:

- Afrosternophorus Beier, 1967
- Garyops Banks, 1909
- Idiogaryops Hoff, 1963
