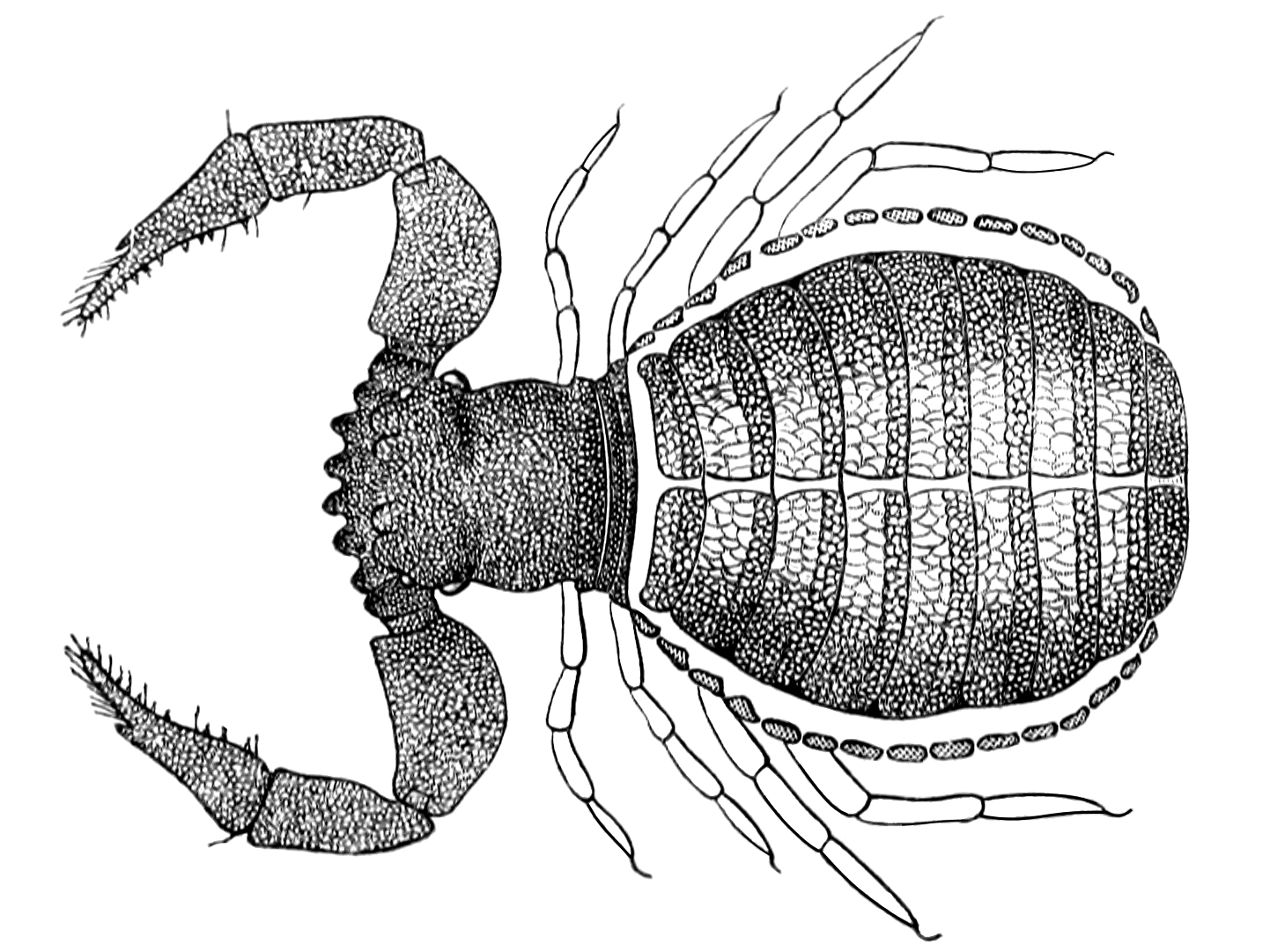
- Feaella mirabilis

Scientific classification
- Domain: Eukaryota
- Kingdom: Animalia
- Phylum: Arthropoda
- Subphylum: Chelicerata
- Class: Arachnida
- Order: Pseudoscorpiones
- Superfamily: Feaelloidea
- Family: Feaellidae; Ellingsen, 1906

= Feaellidae =

Feaellidae Temporal range: Cretaceous–present

Family of pseudoscorpions

Feaellidae is a family of pseudoscorpions, first described by Edvard Ellingsen in 1906.

== Genera ==
As of October 2023, the World Pseudoscorpiones Catalog accepts the following eight genera:

- Antsirananaella Lorenz, Loria, Harvey & Harms, 2022
- Cybella Judson, 2017
- Feaella Ellingsen, 1906
- Iporangella Harvey, Andrade & Pinto-da-Rocha, 2016
- Mahajanganella Lorenz, Loria, Harvey & Harms, 2022
- Toliaranella Lorenz, Loria, Harvey & Harms, 2022
- †Archaeofeaella Kolesnikov, Turbanov, Eskov, Propistsova & Bashkuev, 2022
- †Protofeaella Henderickx, 2016
