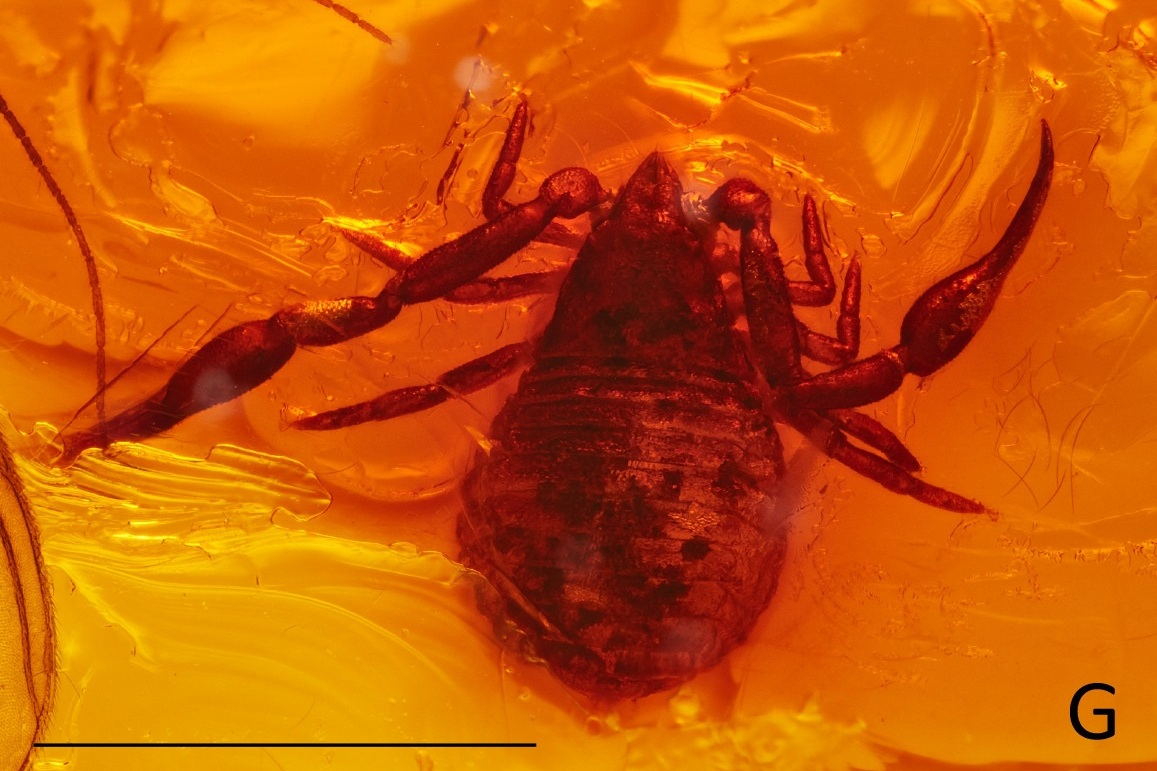
- pseudoscorpion inclusions preserved in amber

Scientific classification
- Kingdom: Animalia
- Phylum: Arthropoda
- Subphylum: Chelicerata
- Class: Arachnida
- Order: Pseudoscorpiones
- Superfamily: Garypoidea
- Family: Geogarypidae; Chamberlin, 1930

= Geogarypidae =

Family of pseudoscorpions

Geogarypidae is a family of pseudoscorpions, which was described in 1930 by American arachnologist Joseph Conrad Chamberlin.

== Genera ==
As of October 2023, the World Pseudoscorpiones Catalog accepted the following genera:

- Afrogarypus Beier, 1931
- Geogarypus Chamberlin, 1930
