= Atemnidae =

Atemnidae Temporal range: Palaeogene–present

Scientific classification
- Domain: Eukaryota
- Kingdom: Animalia
- Phylum: Arthropoda
- Subphylum: Chelicerata
- Class: Arachnida
- Order: Pseudoscorpiones
- Superfamily: Cheliferoidea
- Family: Atemnidae; Kishida, 1929

Family of pseudoscorpions

Atemnidae is a family of pseudoscorpions, first described by Kyukichi Kishida in 1929.

== Genera ==
As of October 2023, the World Pseudoscorpiones Catalog accepts the following twenty-one genera:

- Anatemnus Beier, 1932
- Atemnus Canestrini, 1884
- Athleticatemnus Beier, 1979
- Brazilatemnus Muchmore, 1975
- Caecatemnus Mahnert, 1985
- Catatemnus Beier, 1932
- Cyclatemnus Beier, 1932
- Diplotemnus Chamberlin, 1933
- Mesatemnus Beier & Turk, 1952
- Metatemnus Beier, 1932
- Micratemnus Beier, 1932
- Miratemnus Beier, 1932
- Nilotemnus Klausen, 2009
- Oratemnus Beier, 1932
- Paratemnoides Harvey, 1991
- Stenatemnus Beier, 1932
- Synatemnus Beier, 1944
- Tamenus Beier, 1932
- Titanatemnus Beier, 1932
- Tullgrenius Chamberlin, 1933
- †Progonatemnus Beier, 1955
