= Mark Harvey (arachnologist) =

Australian arachnologist

Mark S. Harvey
- Born: 17 September 1958 (age 67)
- Other name: Mark Stephen Harvey
- Education: Monash University
- Known for: Arachnology
- Scientific career
- Workplaces: Western Australian Museum
- Thesis: Contributions to the systematics of the Pseudoscorpionida (Arachnida) the genus Synsphyronus Chamberlin (Garypidae) and the family Sternophoridae (1983)
- Author abbrev. (zoology): Harvey

Mark Stephen Harvey (born 17 September 1958) is a museum scientist and biologist specializing in Australian arachnids. Since 1989 he has been based at the Western Australian Museum as Curator of Arachnids and Myriapods. He has described over 1,000 species, being one of the few biologists to do so.

== Career ==
Mark Harvey collected his first pseudoscorpion on 16 August 1977 in western Victoria. In 1983, Harvey graduated from Monash University, with a thesis titled: Contributions to the systematics of the Pseudoscorpionida (Arachnida) : the genus Synsphyronus Chamberlin (Garypidae) and the family Sternophoridae. In 1991, due to his contributions to taxonomy, Harvey was presented with the Edgeworth David Medal by the Royal Society of New South Wales. In 2013, he was then awarded the Bonnet Award, named after Pierre Bonnet, for his contributions to arachnology, by the International Society of Arachnology. In 2017, he was awarded the Distinguished Career Award by the Society of Australian Systematic Biologists.

As of 2025, Harvey has described 1,015 new species, making him one of the few biologists to have described over 1,000 species. The first species he described being the pseudoscorpion Geogarypus rhantus, which he described in 1981. Most of the species he has described are pseudoscorpions, and he developed a catalog of them called the Pseudoscorpions of the world. He has also described other arachnids such as spiders and scorpions, as well as some other invertebrates such as millipedes and velvet worms.

As part of the Australian Biological Resources Study 50th Anniversary Awards, Harvey was presented with the Distinguished Career in Taxonomy & Systematics Award. He is a member of the International Commission on Zoological Nomenclature and served as Vice-President from 2016–2022.
