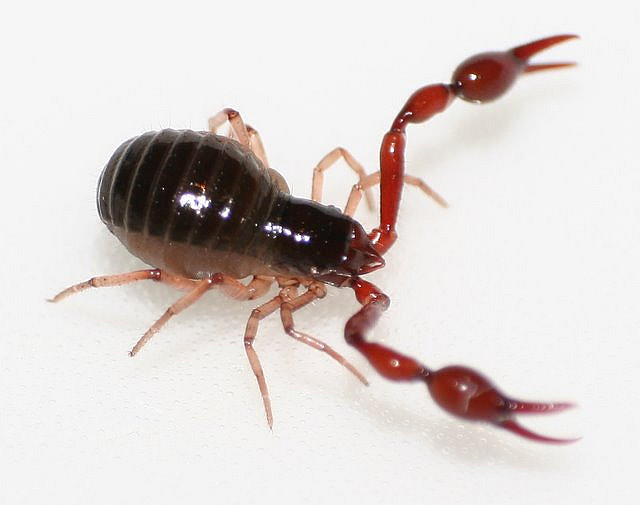
- Neobisium sylvaticum

Scientific classification
- Kingdom: Animalia
- Phylum: Arthropoda
- Subphylum: Chelicerata
- Class: Arachnida
- Order: Pseudoscorpiones; De Geer, 1778

Superfamilies
- Chthonioidea; Neobisioidea; Garypoidea; Cheiridioidea; Feaelloidea; Sternophoroidea; Cheliferoidea

= Pseudoscorpion =

Pseudoscorpions Temporal range: 380–0 Ma Devonian to Recent

Order of arachnids

Pseudoscorpions, also known as false scorpions or book scorpions, are small, scorpion-like arachnids belonging to the order Pseudoscorpiones, also known as Pseudoscorpionida or Chelonethida.

Pseudoscorpions are generally beneficial to humans because they prey on clothes moth larvae, carpet beetle larvae, booklice, ants, mites, and small flies. They are common in many environments, but they are rarely noticed due to their small size. When people see pseudoscorpions, especially indoors, they often mistake them for ticks or small spiders. Pseudoscorpions often carry out phoresis, a form of commensalism in which one organism uses another for the purpose of transport.

== Characteristics ==
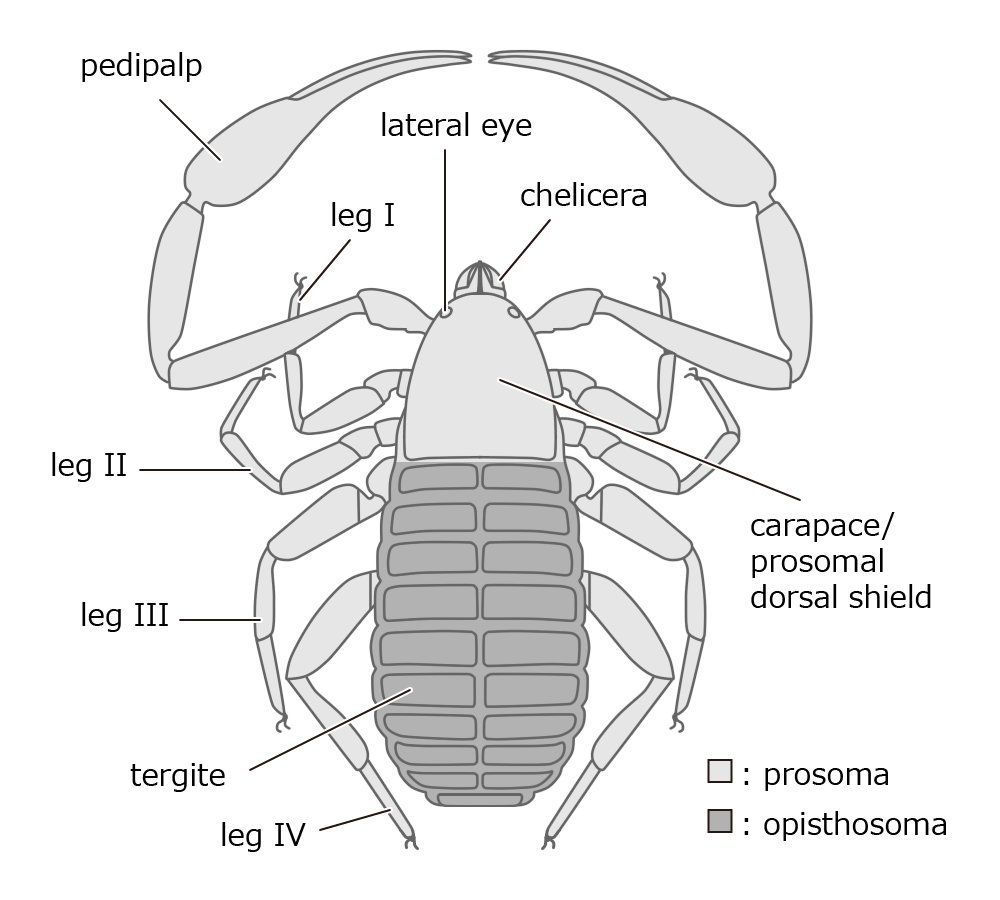
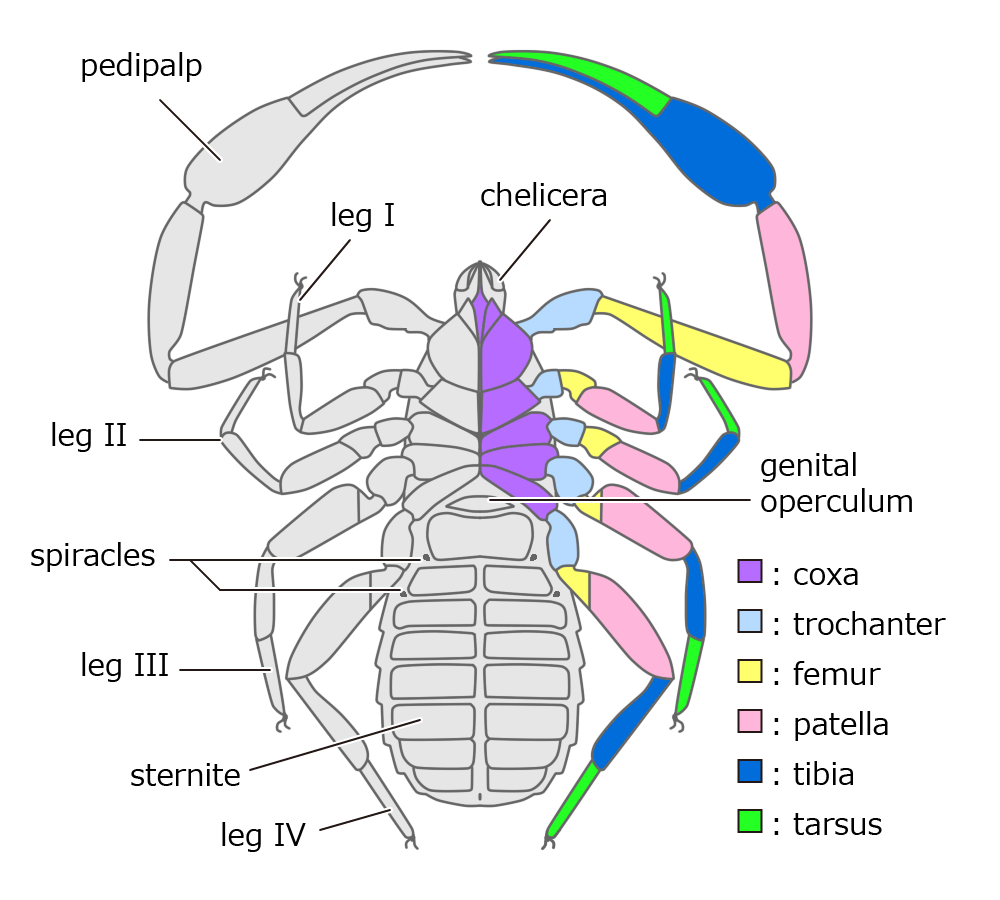
Morphology of a pseudoscorpion

Pseudoscorpions, of the class Arachnida, are small arachnids with a flat, pear-shaped body, and pincer-like pedipalps that resemble those of scorpions. They usually range from 2 to 8 mm (0.08 to 0.31 in) in length. The largest known species is Garypus titanius of Ascension Island at up to 12 mm (0.5 in). Range is generally smaller at an average of 3 mm (0.1 in).

A pseudoscorpion has eight legs with five to seven segments each; the number of fused segments is used to distinguish families and genera. They have two very long pedipalps with palpal chelae (pincers), which strongly resemble the pincers found on a scorpion. The pedipalps generally consist of an immobile "hand" and mobile "finger", the latter controlled by an adductor muscle. Members of the clade Iocheirata, which contains the majority of pseudoscorpions, are venomous, with a venom gland and duct usually located in the mobile finger; the venom is used to immobilize the pseudoscorpion's prey. During digestion, pseudoscorpions exude a mildly corrosive fluid over the prey, then ingest the liquefied remains. In all known cases, this is medically insignificant to humans.

The abdomen, referred to as the opisthosoma, is made up of 12 segments, each protected by sclerotized plates (called tergites above and sternites below). The abdomen is short and rounded at the rear, rather than extending into a segmented tail and stinger like true scorpions. The color of the body can be yellowish tan to dark brown, with the paired claws often a contrasting color. They may have two, four, or no eyes.

Pseudoscorpions spin silk from a gland in their jaws to make disk-shaped cocoons for mating, molting, or waiting out cold weather, but they do not have book lungs like true scorpions and the Tetrapulmonata. Instead, they breathe exclusively through tracheae, which open laterally through two pairs of spiracles on the posterior margins of the sternites of abdominal segments 3 and 4.

== Behavior ==
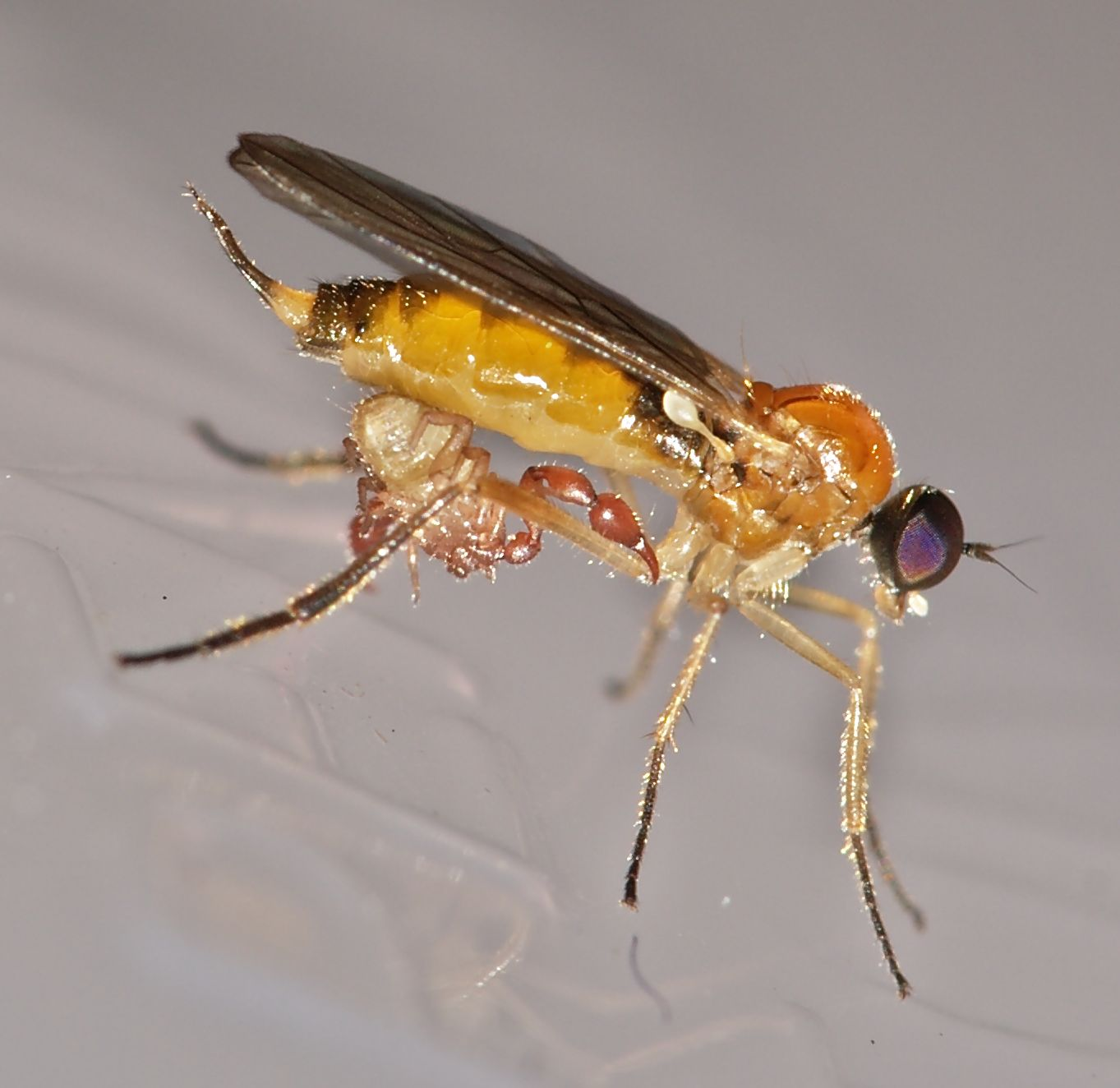
Phoretic pseudoscorpion (Lamprochernes sp.) on a fly, Germany

The male produces a spermatophore, which is attached to the substrate and is picked up by the female. Members of the Cheliferoidea (Atemnidae, Cheliferidae, Chernetidae, and Withiidae) have an elaborate mating dance, which ends with the male navigating the female over his spermatophore. In Cheliferidae, the male also uses his forelegs to open the female genital operculum, and after she has mounted the packet of sperm, assisting the spermatophore's entry by pushing it into her genital opening. Females in species that possess a spermatheca (sperm-storing organ) can store the sperm for a long period of time before fertilizing the eggs, but species without the organ fertilize their eggs shortly after mating. The female carries the fertilized eggs in a brood pouch attached to her abdomen.

Between two and 50 young are hatched in a single brood, with more than one brood per year possible. The young go through three molts called the protonymph, deutonymph, and tritonymph. The developing embryo and the protonymph, which remain attached to the mother, are nourished by a ‘milk’ produced by her ovary. Many species molt in a small, silken igloo that protects them from enemies during this vulnerable period.

After reaching adulthood, they no longer molt, and can live for 2–3 years. They are active in the warm months of the year, overwintering in silken cocoons when the weather grows cold. Smaller species live in debris and humus. Some species are arboreal, while others are phagophiles, eating parasites in an example of cleaning symbiosis. Some species are phoretic, while others may sometimes be found feeding on mites under the wing covers of certain beetles.

== Distribution ==
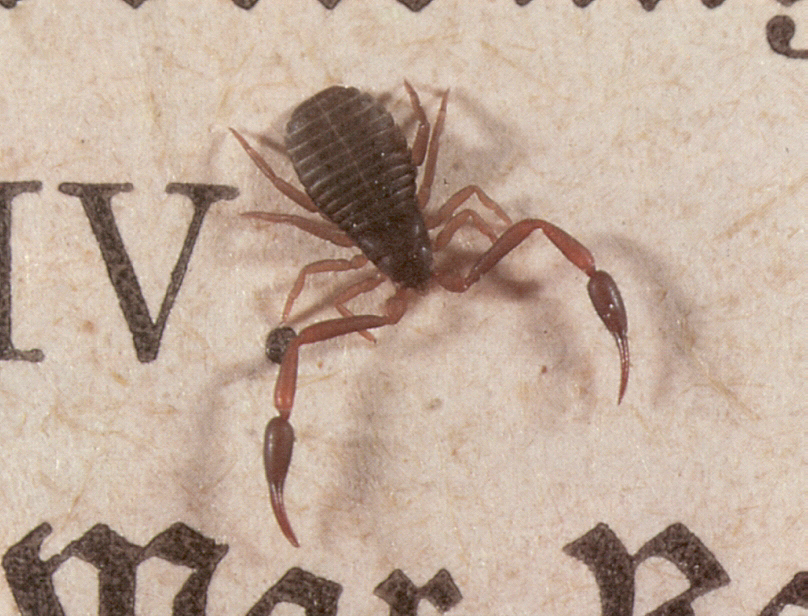
A book scorpion (Chelifer cancroides) on top of an open book

More than 3,300 species of pseudoscorpions are recorded in more than 430 genera, with more being discovered on a regular basis. They range worldwide, even in temperate to cold regions such as Northern Ontario and above the timberline in Wyoming's Rocky Mountains in the United States and the Jenolan Caves of Australia, but have their most dense and diverse populations in the tropics and subtropics, where they spread even to island territories such as the Canary Islands, where around 25 endemic species have been found. Two endemic species are found also on the Maltese Islands. Species have been found under tree bark, in leaf and pine litter, in soil, in tree hollows, under stones, in caves such as the Movile Cave, at the seashore in the intertidal zone, and within fractured rocks.

Chelifer cancroides is the species most commonly found in homes, where it is often observed in rooms with dusty books. There, the tiny animals (2.5–4.5 mm or 0.10–0.18 in) can find their food such as booklice and house dust mites. They enter homes by riding insects (phoresy) larger than themselves or are brought in with firewood.

== Evolution ==
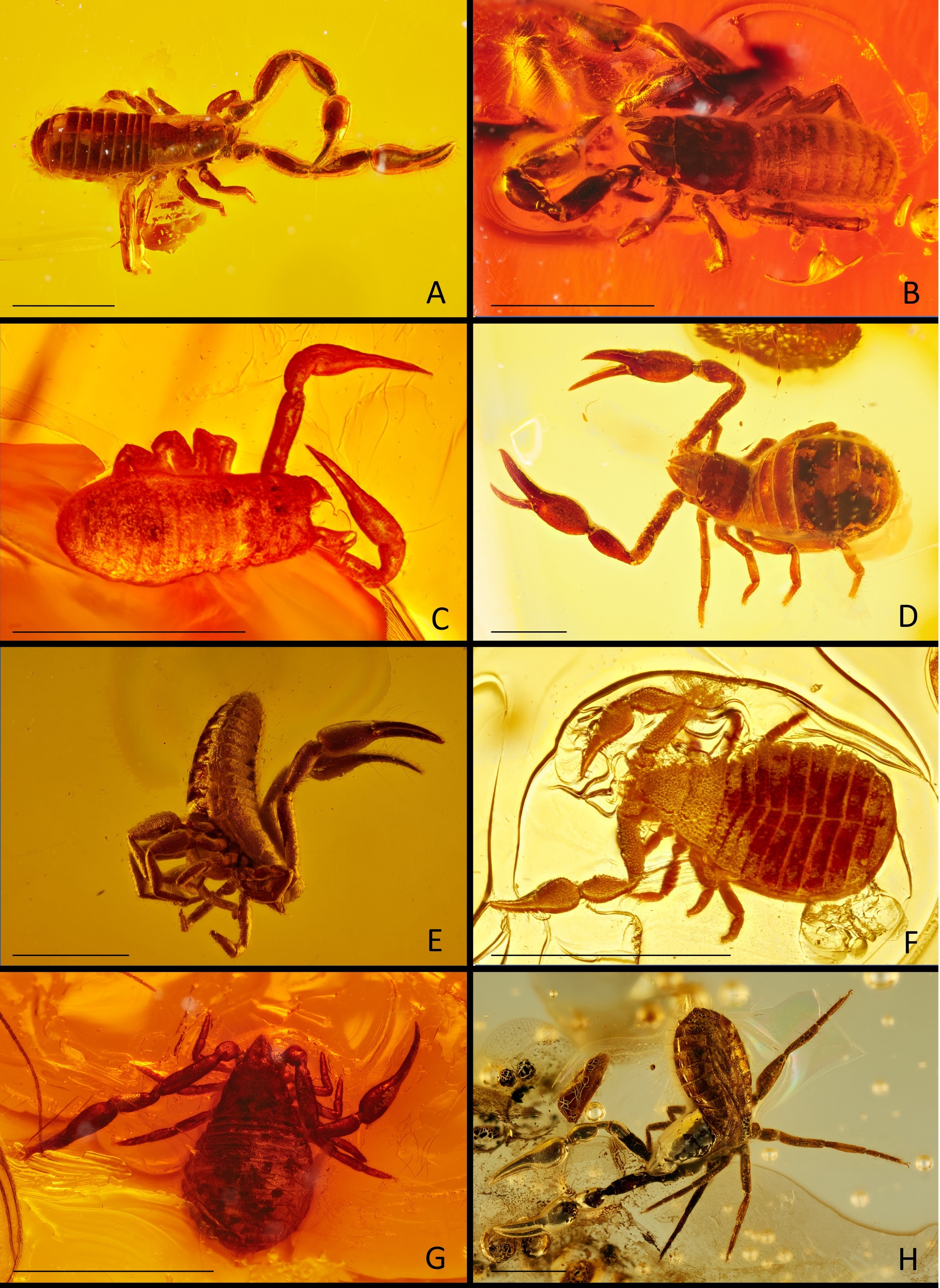
Example of pseudoscorpions preserved in amber. (a) Progonatemnus succineus, (b) Roncus succineus, (c) Chelignathus kochii, (d) Neobisium exstinctum, (e) Electrochelifer balticus, (f) Cheiridium hartmanni, (g) Geogarypus macrodactylus, (h) Microcreagris koellneri

The oldest known fossil pseudoscorpion, Dracochela deprehendor, is known from cuticle fragments of nymphs found in the Panther Mountain Formation near Gilboa in New York, dating to the mid-Devonian, around 383 million years ago. It has all of the traits of a modern pseudoscorpion, indicating that the order evolved very early in the history of land animals. Its morphology suggests that it is more primitive than any living pseudoscorpion. As with most other arachnid orders, the pseudoscorpions have changed very little since they first appeared, retaining almost all the features of their original forms. After the Devonian fossils, almost no other fossils of pseudoscorpions are known for over 250 million years until Cretaceous fossils in amber, all belonging to modern families, suggesting that the major diversification of pseudoscorpions had already taken place by this time. The only fossil from this time gap is Archaeofeaella from the Triassic of Ukraine, around 227 million years ago, which is suggested to be an early relative of the family Feaellidae.

== Historical references ==
Pseudoscorpions were first described by Aristotle, who probably found them among scrolls in a library where they would have been feeding on booklice. Robert Hooke referred to a "Land-Crab" in his 1665 work Micrographia. Another reference in the 1780s, when George Adams wrote of "a lobster-insect, spied by some labouring men who were drinking their porter, and borne away by an ingenious gentleman, who brought it to my lodging."

== Classification ==
These taxon numbers have been calculated as of the end of 2023:

- Atemnidae Kishida, 1929 (21 genera, 194 species)
- Bochicidae Chamberlin, 1930 (12 genera, 44 species)
- Cheiridiidae Hansen, 1894 (9 genera, 81 species)
- Cheliferidae Risso, 1827 (64 genera, 312 species)
- Chernetidae Menge, 1855 (120 genera, 728 species)
- Chthoniidae Daday, 1888 (54 genera, 909 species)
- Feaellidae Ellingsen, 1906 (8 genus, 37 species)
- Garypidae Simon, 1879 (11 genera, 110 species)
- Garypinidae Daday, 1888 (21 genera, 94 species)
- Geogarypidae Chamberlin, 1930 (2 genera, 81 species)
- Gymnobisiidae Beier, 1947 (4 genera, 17 species)
- Hyidae Chamberlin, 1930 (2 genera, 41 species)
- Ideoroncidae Chamberlin, 1930 (15 genera, 86 species)
- Larcidae Harvey, 1992 (1 genus, 15 species)
- Menthidae Chamberlin, 1930 (5 genera, 12 species)
- Neobisiidae Chamberlin, 1930 (34 genera, 748 species)
- Olpiidae Banks, 1895 (24 genera, 211 species)
- Parahyidae Harvey, 1992 (1 genus, 1 species)
- Pseudochiridiidae Chamberlin, 1923 (2 genera, 13 species)
- Pseudogarypidae Chamberlin, 1923 (2 genera, 12 species)
- Pseudotyrannochthoniidae Beier, 1932 (6 genera, 80 species)
- Sternophoridae Chamberlin, 1923 (3 genera, 21 species)
- Syarinidae Chamberlin, 1930 (18 genera, 125 species)
- Withiidae Chamberlin, 1931 (37 genera, 170 species)
- †Dracochelidae Schawaller, Shear & Bonamo, 1991 (1 genus, 1 species)

This amounts to 24 living families, 471 genera, and 4,142 described species of pseudoscorpions.

=== Cladogram ===
After Benavides et al., 2019, with historic taxonomic groups from Harvey (1992).

- Order
  - Suborder
    - Infraorder
      - Parvorder
        - Superfamily
          - Family

- Pseudoscorpiones
  - - Palaeosphyronida
      - - Dracocheloidea
          †Dracochelidae
  - - Heterosphyronida
      - - Chthonioidea
          - Pseudotyrannochthoniidae
          - Chthoniidae
    - Homosphyronida
      - Atoposphyronida
        - - Feaelloidea
            - Pseudogarypidae
            - Feaellidae
      - Iocheirata
        - Hemictenata
          - - Neobisioidea
              - - Ideoroncidae
                - - Bochicidae
                  - Hyidae
              - - - Syarinidae
                  - Parahyidae
                - - Gymnobisiidae
                  - Neobisiidae
        - Panctenata
          - - - Garypoidea
                - Geogarypidae
                - - Hesperolpiidae
                  - - Garypidae
                    - - Menthidae
                      - Olpiidae
          - - - - Garypinoidea
                  - Garypinidae
                  - Larcidae
            - - - Cheiridioidea
                  - Cheiridiidae
                  - Pseudochiridiidae
                - Sternophoroidea
                  Sternophoridae
              - - Cheliferoidea
                  - - - Withiidae
                      - Atemnidae
                    - Cheliferidae
                  - Chernetidae
