= C. indica =

C. indica most often refers to:

- Cannabis indica, a plant species better known as marijuana

C. indica may also refer to:

- Caloria indica, a sea slug species
- Canis indica, the Indian wolf, a possible distinct species of wolves
- Canna indica, the saka siri, Indian shot, canna, bandera, chancle, coyol, platanillo or kardal, a plant species
- Chalcophaps indica, the emerald dove, a bird species found in tropical southern Asia
- Chitra indica, a turtle species found in the major rivers of India and Pakistan
- Citrus indica, a species of hybrid citrus native to South Asia
- Cnemaspis indica, the Indian day gecko, a gecko species found in India
- Compsaditha indica, a pseudoscorpion species in the genus Compsaditha found in India
- Cylindraspis indica, an extinct giant tortoise species

== Synonyms ==
- Calosanthes indica, a synonym for Oroxylum indicum, a tree species
- Coccinia indica, a synonym for Coccinia grandis
- Cosmophila indica, a synonym for Anomis flava, the cotton looper or tropical anomis, a moth species
- Cupressus sempervirens var. indica, a synonym for Cupressus torulosa, a tree species

== See also ==
- Indica (disambiguation)
