= S. hirsuta =

S. hirsuta may refer to:

- Sororoditha hirsuta, a pseudoscorpion species found in Brazil
- Staurogyne hirsuta, a plant species native of Cerrado vegetation of Brazil

== See also ==
- Hirsuta
