= Cryptoditha elegans =

Scientific classification
- Kingdom: Animalia
- Phylum: Arthropoda
- Subphylum: Chelicerata
- Class: Arachnida
- Order: Pseudoscorpiones
- Family: Chthoniidae
- Genus: Cryptoditha
- Species: C. elegans

Binomial name
- Cryptoditha elegans Beier, 1931

Synonyms
- Tridenchthonius elegans Beier, 1931; Cryptoditha elegans (Beier); Cryptoditha cf. elegans (Beier)

Species of pseudoscorpion

Cryptoditha elegans is a species of pseudoscorpions. It is found in Brazil. The type locality is Passa Quatro, Minais Gerais.
