= Sororoditha hirsuta =

Scientific classification
- Domain: Eukaryota
- Kingdom: Animalia
- Phylum: Arthropoda
- Subphylum: Chelicerata
- Class: Arachnida
- Order: Pseudoscorpiones
- Family: Chthoniidae
- Genus: Sororoditha
- Species: S. hirsuta

Binomial name
- Sororoditha hirsuta (Balzan, 1887)

Species of pseudoscorpion

Sororoditha hirsuta is a species of pseudoscorpion in the family Tridenchthoniidae.
