= T. africanus =

T. africanus may refer to:

- Tridenchthonius africanus, a pseudoscorpion species found in Tanzania
- Turraeanthus africana, a plant species found in Angola, Benin and Cameroon

== See also ==
- Africanus (disambiguation)
