= Anaulacodithella plurisetosa =

Scientific classification
- Kingdom: Animalia
- Phylum: Arthropoda
- Subphylum: Chelicerata
- Class: Arachnida
- Order: Pseudoscorpiones
- Family: Chthoniidae
- Genus: Anaulacodithella
- Species: A. plurisetosa

Binomial name
- Anaulacodithella plurisetosa Beier, 1976

Species of pseudoscorpion

Anaulacodithella plurisetosa is a species of pseudoscorpion in the Chthoniidae family. It is endemic to Australia. It was described in 1976 by Austrian arachnologist Max Beier.

== Description ==
The body length is 1.3–1.5 mm.

== Distribution and habitat ==
The species occurs only on Lord Howe Island in the Tasman Sea. The type locality is Boat Harbour. The pseudoscorpions are found in plant litter.

== Behaviour ==
The pseudoscorpions are terrestrial predators.
