= C. pygmaea =

C. pygmaea may refer to:

- Caragana pygmaea, a species of flowering plant
- Cattleya pygmaea, the small orange sophronitis, a species of orchid in the genus Cattleya found in Brazil and Espírito Santo
- Cebuella pygmaea, the pygmy marmoset or dwarf monkey, a New World monkey species native to the rainforest canopies of western Brazil, southeastern Colombia, eastern Ecuador, eastern Peru and northern Bolivia
- Coenosia pygmaea, a species of fly in the genus Coenosia
- Compsaditha pygmaea, a species of pseudoscorpion in the genus Compsaditha found in the Philippines
- Crematogaster pygmaea, a species of ant in the genus Crematogaster
- Cupressus pygmaea, the Mendocino cypress, a taxon of disputed status endemic to certain coastal terraces and coastal mountain ranges of Mendocino and Sonoma Counties in northwestern California
