= Paraliochthonius darwini =

Scientific classification
- Kingdom: Animalia
- Phylum: Arthropoda
- Subphylum: Chelicerata
- Class: Arachnida
- Order: Pseudoscorpiones
- Family: Chthoniidae
- Genus: Paraliochthonius
- Species: P. darwini

Binomial name
- Paraliochthonius darwini Harvey, 2009

Species of pseudoscorpion

Paraliochthonius darwini is a species of pseudoscorpion in the Chthoniidae family. It was described in 2009 by Australian entomologist Mark Harvey.

== Etymology ==
The specific epithet darwini honours naturalist Charles Darwin (1809–1882) on the 200th anniversary of his birth, and the 150th anniversary of the publication of his On the Origin of Species, as well as referring to the city of Darwin named after him, where some specimens were obtained.

== Description ==
The body length of the male holotype is 1.31 mm; that of a female paratype 1.50 mm. The colour of adults is a uniform light yellowish-brown.

== Distribution and habitat ==
The species occurs in coastal areas of northern Australia. The type locality is Berthier Island in the Kimberley region of Western Australia. Paratype specimens were also collected from Plater Beach and Doctors Gully, near Darwin in the Top End of the Northern Territory. The pseudoscorpions were found beneath rocks in intertidal habitats.

== Behaviour ==
The pseudoscorpions are terrestrial predators.
