= Anaulacodithella australica =

Scientific classification
- Kingdom: Animalia
- Phylum: Arthropoda
- Subphylum: Chelicerata
- Class: Arachnida
- Order: Pseudoscorpiones
- Family: Chthoniidae
- Genus: Anaulacodithella
- Species: A. australica

Binomial name
- Anaulacodithella australica Beier, 1969

Species of pseudoscorpion

Anaulacodithella australica is a species of pseudoscorpion in the Chthoniidae family. It was described in 1969 by Austrian arachnologist Max Beier.

== Distribution and habitat ==
The species occurs in south-eastern Queensland. The type locality is the Lamington National Park. The pseudoscorpions are found in closed forest plant litter.

== Behaviour ==
The pseudoscorpions are terrestrial predators.
