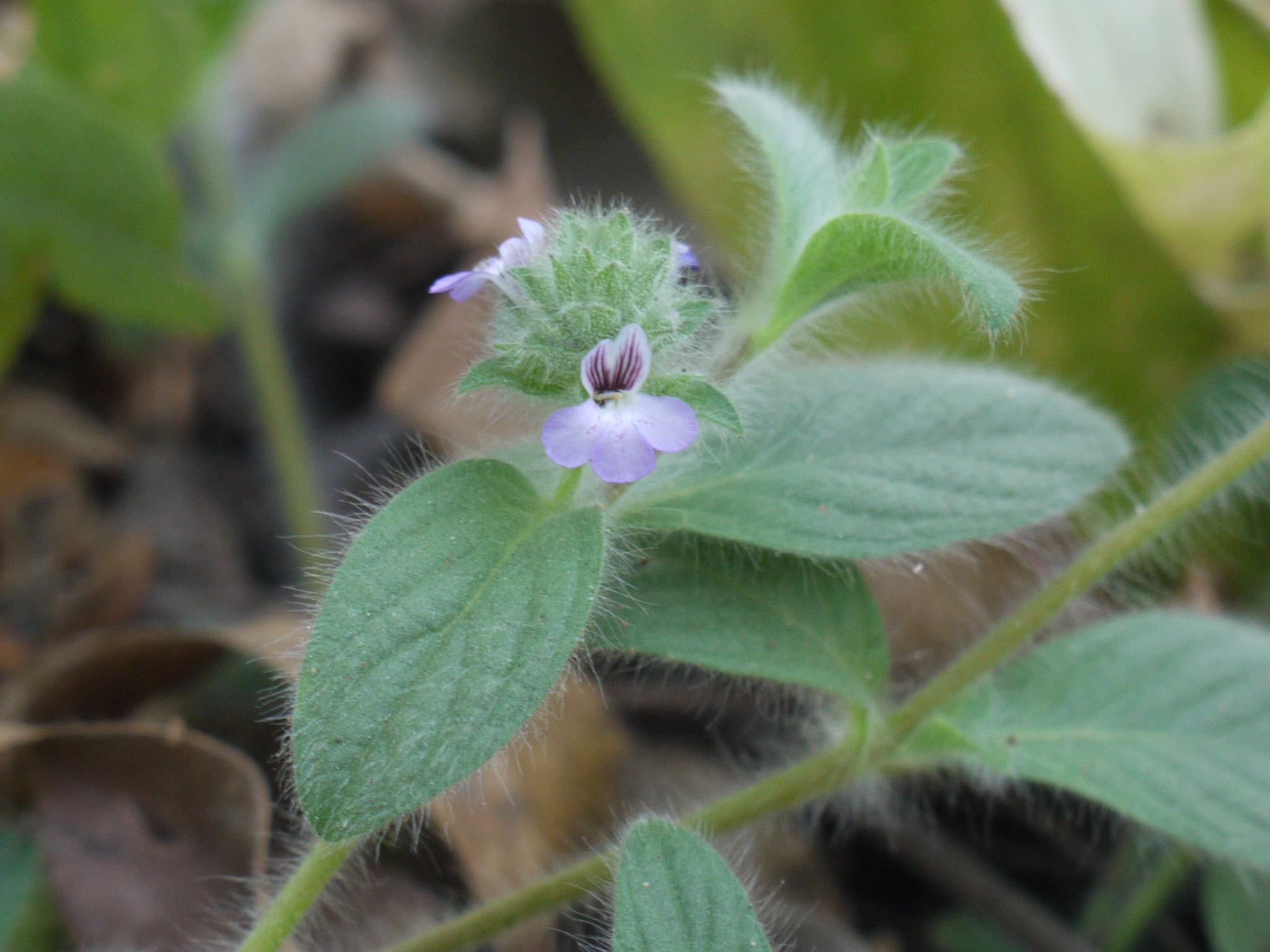
- Nelsonia canescens

Scientific classification
- Kingdom: Plantae
- Clade: Tracheophytes
- Clade: Angiosperms
- Clade: Eudicots
- Clade: Asterids
- Order: Lamiales
- Family: Acanthaceae
- Subfamily: Nelsonioideae

Type genus
- Nelsonia

= Nelsonioideae =

Subfamily of flowering plants

Nelsonioideae is a subfamily of plants in the family Acanthaceae, with a pantropical distribution.

== Genera ==
- Anisosepalum
- Elytraria
- Nelsonia
- Saintpauliopsis
- Staurogyne (synonyms: Gynocraterium, Ophiorrhiziphyllon)
