= Anisoditha =

Scientific classification
- Kingdom: Animalia
- Phylum: Arthropoda
- Subphylum: Chelicerata
- Class: Arachnida
- Order: Pseudoscorpiones
- Family: Chthoniidae
- Subfamily: Chthoniinae
- Genus: Anisoditha; J. C. Chamberlin and R. V. Chamberlin, 1945

Genus of pseudoscorpions

Anisoditha is a genus of pseudoscorpions in the family Chthoniidae. There is at least one described species in Anisoditha, A. curvidigitata.

Anisoditha was formerly in the family Tridenchthoniidae but was recently moved to the family Chthoniidae.
