= Pycnodithella harveyi =

Scientific classification
- Kingdom: Animalia
- Phylum: Arthropoda
- Subphylum: Chelicerata
- Class: Arachnida
- Order: Pseudoscorpiones
- Family: Chthoniidae
- Genus: Pycnodithella
- Species: P. harveyi

Binomial name
- Pycnodithella harveyi Kennedy, 1989

Species of pseudoscorpion

Pycnodithella harveyi is a species of pseudoscorpion in the Chthoniidae family. It is endemic to Australia. It was described in 1989 by Australian athlete and zoologist Clarice Kennedy. The specific epithet harveyi honours arachnologist Mark Harvey for his contributions to the knowledge of the pseudoscorpion fauna of Australia.

== Description ==
The body length is 0.90–0.99 mm. The colour is dark brown.

== Distribution and habitat ==
The species occurs in eastern New South Wales. The type locality is the Macquarie University campus in North Ryde, Sydney. The pseudoscorpions were found in plant litter.

== Behaviour ==
The pseudoscorpions are terrestrial predators.
