= Heterolophus australicus =

Scientific classification
- Kingdom: Animalia
- Phylum: Arthropoda
- Subphylum: Chelicerata
- Class: Arachnida
- Order: Pseudoscorpiones
- Family: Chthoniidae
- Genus: Heterolophus
- Species: H. australicus

Binomial name
- Heterolophus australicus Beier, 1969

Species of pseudoscorpion

Heterolophus australicus is a species of pseudoscorpion in the Chthoniidae family. It is endemic to Australia. It was described in 1969 by Austrian arachnologist Max Beier.

== Distribution and habitat ==
The species occurs in south-eastern Queensland. The type locality is the Joalah section of the Tamborine National Park. The pseudoscorpions were found in closed forest plant litter.

== Behaviour ==
The pseudoscorpions are terrestrial predators.
