= Ephippiochthonius tetrachelatus =

Scientific classification
- Kingdom: Animalia
- Phylum: Arthropoda
- Subphylum: Chelicerata
- Class: Arachnida
- Order: Pseudoscorpiones
- Family: Chthoniidae
- Genus: Ephippiochthonius
- Species: E. tetrachelatus

Binomial name
- Ephippiochthonius tetrachelatus (Preyssler, 1790)

Synonyms
- Chthonius maculatus Menge, 1855; Chthonius longipalpis Banks, 1891; Chthonius tetrachelatus (Preyssler, 1790); Scorpio tetrachelatus Preyssler, 1790

Species of pseudoscorpion

Ephippiochthonius tetrachelatus is a species of pseudoscorpion in the Chthoniidae family. It was described in 1790 by Czech entomologist Johann Daniel Preyssler.

== Distribution and habitat ==
The species has a cosmopolitan distribution. It is thought to have been introduced to the Australian state of Victoria from Europe. The type locality is Bohemia, though the holotype is lost. The pseudoscorpions inhabit plant litter.

== Behaviour ==
The pseudoscorpions are terrestrial predators.
