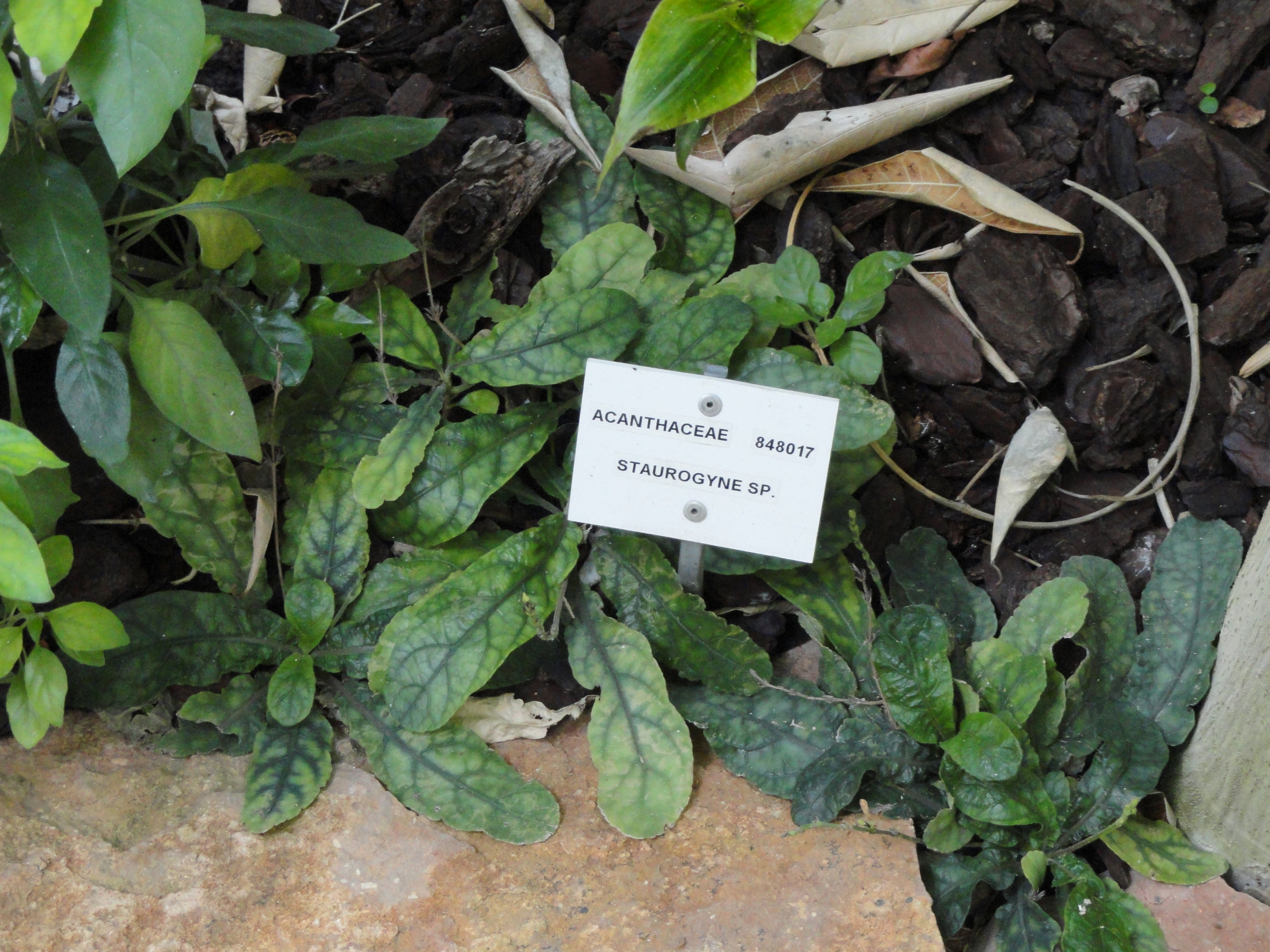

Scientific classification
- Kingdom: Plantae
- Clade: Tracheophytes
- Clade: Angiosperms
- Clade: Eudicots
- Clade: Asterids
- Order: Lamiales
- Family: Acanthaceae
- Subfamily: Nelsonioideae
- Genus: Staurogyne; Wall.

Species
- See text

Synonyms
- Ebermaiera Nees; Ebermayera Meisn., orth. var.; Ebermeyera Endl., orth. var.; Ebermiera Wight, orth. var.; Erythracanthus Nees; Gynocraterium Bremek.; Neozenkerina Mildbr.; Nigrolea Noronha; Ophiorrhiziphyllon Kurz; Phyllophiorhiza Kuntze; Staurogynopsis Mangenot & Aké Assi; Stiftia Pohl ex Nees; Zenkerina Engl.

= Staurogyne =

Genus of flowering plants

Staurogyne is a genus of plants in the family Acanthaceae.

== Description ==
Species of the genus Staurogyne tend to have annual or perennial herbs. They may also have shrubs. The stems of Staurogyne tend to be short.

== Distribution ==
Species of Staurogyne are native to the tropical regions of western and central Africa, Asia, Central and South America, New Guinea, and Australia.

== Species ==
The genus includes 155 accepted species.

- Staurogyne alba Braz & R.Monteiro
- Staurogyne amboinica Bremek.
- Staurogyne amoena Benoist
- Staurogyne andamanica M.V.Ramana, Sanjappa, Venu & Chorghe
- Staurogyne anigozanthus (Nees) Kuntze
- Staurogyne anomala Bremek.
- Staurogyne arcuata C.B.Clarke
- Staurogyne argentea Wall.
- Staurogyne aristata E.Hossain
- Staurogyne arunachalensis R.Kr.Singh, D.Borah & Yama
- Staurogyne athroantha Bremek.
- Staurogyne atropurpurea E.Hossain
- Staurogyne axillaris S.Moore
- Staurogyne balansae Benoist
- Staurogyne batuensis Bremek.
- Staurogyne beddomei (C.B.Clarke) Kuntze
- Staurogyne bella Bremek.
- Staurogyne bicolor (Mildbr.) Champl.
- Staurogyne brachiata (Hiern) Leonard
- Staurogyne brachystachya Benoist
- Staurogyne brevicaulis Benoist
- Staurogyne bullata Bremek.
- Staurogyne burbidgei C.B.Clarke ex Bremek.
- Staurogyne cambodiana (Benoist) E.Hossain
- Staurogyne caobangensis D.V.Hai & Joongku Lee
- Staurogyne capillipes Bremek.
- Staurogyne capitata E.A.Bruce
- Staurogyne chapaensis Benoist
- Staurogyne ciliata Elmer
- Staurogyne citrina Ridl.
- Staurogyne comosa Kuntze
- Staurogyne concinnula (Hance) Kuntze
- Staurogyne condensata (Ridl.) Bremek.
- Staurogyne coriacea (T.Anderson ex C.B.Clarke) Kuntze
- Staurogyne cuneata J.B.Imlay
- Staurogyne dasyphylla Bremek.
- Staurogyne debilis (T.Anderson) C.B.Clarke
- Staurogyne densifolia Bremek.
- Staurogyne diandra E.Hossain
- Staurogyne diantheroides Lindau
- Staurogyne dispar J.B.Imlay
- Staurogyne elegans (Nees) Kuntze
- Staurogyne elmeri Co ex Pelser
- Staurogyne elongata (Nees) Kuntze
- Staurogyne ericoides Lindau
- Staurogyne euryphylla E.Hossain
- Staurogyne eustachya Lindau
- Staurogyne expansa Bremek.
- Staurogyne fastigiata (Nees) Kuntze
- Staurogyne filipes E.Hossain
- Staurogyne filisepala J.R.I.Wood & K.Armstr.
- Staurogyne flava Braz & R.Monteiro
- Staurogyne glutinosa (Wall. ex C.B.Clarke) Kuntze
- Staurogyne gracilis (T.Anderson) Kuntze
- Staurogyne grandiflora E.Hossain
- Staurogyne griffithiana (Nees) Kuntze
- Staurogyne guianensis (Bremek.) T.F.Daniel & McDade
- Staurogyne hainanensis C.Y.Wu & H.S.Lo
- Staurogyne havilandii C.B.Clarke ex Bremek.
- Staurogyne helferi (T.Anderson) Kuntze
- Staurogyne hirsuta (Nees) Kuntze
- Staurogyne humifusa Bremek.
- Staurogyne humilis (Nees) Kuntze
- Staurogyne hypoleuca Benoist
- Staurogyne inaequalis E.Hossain
- Staurogyne incana (Blume) Kuntze
- Staurogyne itatiaiae (Wawra) Leonard
- Staurogyne jaheri Bremek.
- Staurogyne kaengkrachanensis Choopan
- Staurogyne kamerunensis (Engl.) Benoist
- Staurogyne kerrii E.Hossain
- Staurogyne kinabaluensis Bremek.
- Staurogyne kingiana C.B.Clarke
- Staurogyne lanceolata (Blume) Kuntze
- Staurogyne lasiobotrys (Nees) Kuntze
- Staurogyne latifolia Bremek.
- Staurogyne lepidagathoides Leonard
- Staurogyne letestuana Benoist
- Staurogyne longeciliata Bremek.
- Staurogyne longibracteata E.Hossain
- Staurogyne longicuneata H.S.Lo
- Staurogyne longifolia (Nees) Kuntze
- Staurogyne longispica (Ridl.) Ridl.
- Staurogyne macclellandii (T.Anderson) Kuntze
- Staurogyne macrobotrya (Kurz) T.F.Daniel & McDade
- Staurogyne macrophylla (T.Anderson ex C.B.Clarke) Kuntze
- Staurogyne major Benoist
- Staurogyne malaccensis C.B.Clarke
- Staurogyne mandioccana (Nees) Kuntze
- Staurogyne merguensis (T.Anderson) Kuntze
- Staurogyne merrillii Bremek.
- Staurogyne minarum (Nees) Kuntze
- Staurogyne miqueliana Kuntze
- Staurogyne monticola Benoist
- Staurogyne neesii (S.Vidal) Merr.
- Staurogyne novoguineensis (Kaneh. & Hatus.) B.L.Burtt
- Staurogyne obtusa (Nees) Kuntze
- Staurogyne ophiorrhizoides Elmer
- Staurogyne palawanensis (Elmer) Bremek.
- Staurogyne paludosa (Mangenot & Aké Assi) Heine
- Staurogyne panayensis Bremek.
- Staurogyne paniculata (Wall. ex T.Anderson) Kuntze
- Staurogyne paotingensis C.Y.Wu & H.S.Lo
- Staurogyne papuana Lauterb.
- Staurogyne parva Braz & R.Monteiro
- Staurogyne parvicaulis B.Hansen
- Staurogyne parviflora (T.Anderson ex C.B.Clarke) Kuntze
- Staurogyne perpusilla A.N.Henry & N.P.Balakr.
- Staurogyne petelotii Benoist
- Staurogyne priariganensis Bremek.
- Staurogyne pseudocapitata Champl.
- Staurogyne punctata J.B.Imlay
- Staurogyne purpurea Aver. & K.S.Nguyen
- Staurogyne racemosa (Roxb.) Kuntze
- Staurogyne ranaiensis Bremek.
- Staurogyne repens (Nees) Kuntze
- Staurogyne riedeliana (Nees) Kuntze
- Staurogyne rosulata Bremek.
- Staurogyne rubescens Braz & R.Monteiro
- Staurogyne samarensis Bremek.
- Staurogyne sandakanica Bremek.
- Staurogyne scandens Benoist
- Staurogyne scopulicola Kiew
- Staurogyne sesamoides (Hand.-Mazz.) B.L.Burtt
- Staurogyne setigera (Nees) Kuntze
- Staurogyne shanica W.W.Sm.
- Staurogyne sichuanica H.S.Lo
- Staurogyne simonsii (T.Anderson) Kuntze
- Staurogyne singularis Bremek.
- Staurogyne sinica C.Y.Wu & H.S.Lo
- Staurogyne spatulata (Blume) Koord.
- Staurogyne spiciflora (Miq.) Bremek.
- Staurogyne spiciformis E.Hossain
- Staurogyne spraguei Wassh.
- Staurogyne stenophylla Merr. & Chun
- Staurogyne stolonifera (Nees) Kuntze
- Staurogyne strigosa C.Y.Wu & H.S.Lo
- Staurogyne subcapitata Bremek.
- Staurogyne subcordata Benoist
- Staurogyne subglabra C.B.Clarke
- Staurogyne subrosulata E.Hossain
- Staurogyne sundana Bremek.
- Staurogyne sylvatica Lindau ex Braz & R.Monteiro
- Staurogyne tenera Benoist
- Staurogyne tenuispica Bremek.
- Staurogyne thyrsoidea (Nees) Kuntze
- Staurogyne trinitensis Leonard
- Staurogyne vauthieriana (Nees) Kuntze
- Staurogyne veronicifolia (Nees) Kuntze
- Staurogyne vicina Benoist
- Staurogyne viscida (Ridl.) Bremek.
- Staurogyne warmingiana (Hiern) Leonard
- Staurogyne yamokmehong J.R.I.Wood & K.Armstr.
- Staurogyne yunnanensis H.S.Lo
- Staurogyne zeylanica (Nees) Kuntze
