= Neoditha =

Scientific classification
- Kingdom: Animalia
- Phylum: Arthropoda
- Subphylum: Chelicerata
- Class: Arachnida
- Order: Pseudoscorpiones
- Family: Chthoniidae
- Subfamily: Tridenchthoniinae
- Genus: Neoditha; Feio, 1945

Genus of pseudoscorpions

Neoditha is a genus of pseudoscorpions in the family Chthoniidae. There is at least one described species in Neoditha, N. irusanga.
