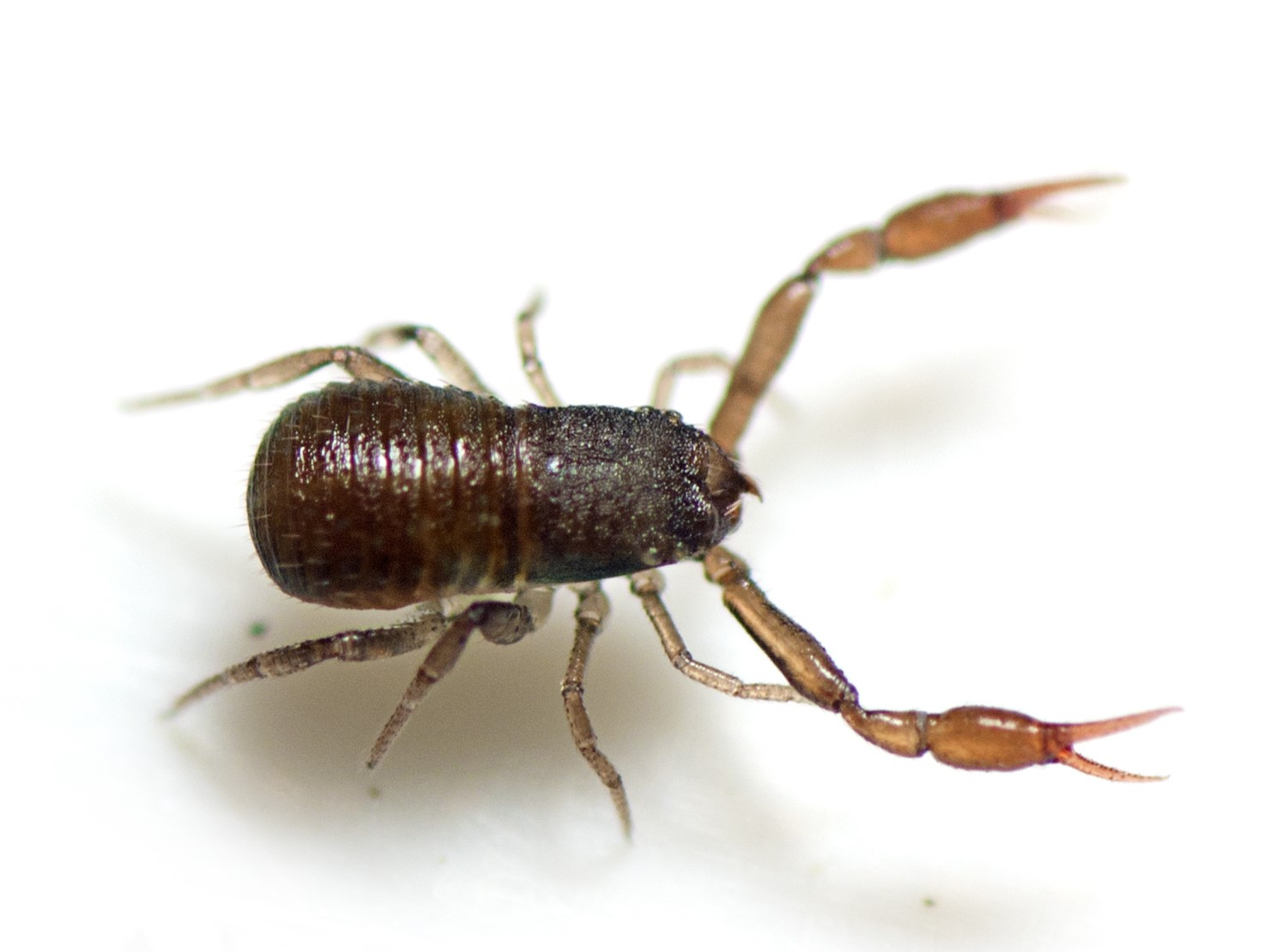

Scientific classification
- Domain: Eukaryota
- Kingdom: Animalia
- Phylum: Arthropoda
- Subphylum: Chelicerata
- Class: Arachnida
- Order: Pseudoscorpiones
- Family: Chthoniidae
- Subfamily: Verrucadithinae
- Genus: Anaulacodithella; Beier, 1944

Synonyms
- Xenoditha Chamberlin & Chamberlin, 1945

= Anaulacodithella =

Genus of pseudoscorpions

Anaulacodithella is a genus of pseudoscorpions in the family Chthoniidae. It has about seven described species.

== Species ==
The genus contains the following species:

- Anaulacodithella angustimana Beier, 1955
- Anaulacodithella australica Beier, 1969
- Anaulacodithella deserticola (Beier, 1944)
- Anaulacodithella mordax (Tullgren, 1907)
- Anaulacodithella novacaledonica Beier, 1966
- Anaulacodithella plurisetosa Beier, 1976
- Anaulacodithella reticulata Beier, 1966
