= Dithella =

Scientific classification
- Kingdom: Animalia
- Phylum: Arthropoda
- Subphylum: Chelicerata
- Class: Arachnida
- Order: Pseudoscorpiones
- Family: Chthoniidae
- Subfamily: Tridenchthoniinae
- Genus: Dithella; J. C. Chamberlin and R. V. Chamberlin, 1945

Genus of pseudoscorpions

Dithella is a genus of pseudoscorpions in the family Chthoniidae. There are at least two described species in Dithella.

== Species ==
These two species belong to the genus Dithella:

- Dithella javana (Tullgren, 1912)
- Dithella philippinica Beier, 1967
