= Heterolophus =

Scientific classification
- Domain: Eukaryota
- Kingdom: Animalia
- Phylum: Arthropoda
- Subphylum: Chelicerata
- Class: Arachnida
- Order: Pseudoscorpiones
- Family: Chthoniidae
- Subfamily: Tridenchthoniinae
- Genus: Heterolophus; Tömösváry, 1884

Genus of pseudoscorpions

Heterolophus is a genus of pseudoscorpions in the family Chthoniidae. There are at least four described species in Heterolophus.

== Species ==
These four species belong to the genus Heterolophus:

- Heterolophus australicus Beier, 1969
- Heterolophus clathratus (Tullgren, 1907)
- Heterolophus guttiger Tömösváry, 1884
- Heterolophus nitens Tömösváry, 1884
