= Verrucadithella =

Scientific classification
- Kingdom: Animalia
- Phylum: Arthropoda
- Subphylum: Chelicerata
- Class: Arachnida
- Order: Pseudoscorpiones
- Family: Chthoniidae
- Subfamily: Verrucadithinae
- Genus: Verrucadithella; Beier, 1931

Genus of pseudoscorpions

Verrucadithella is a genus of pseudoscorpions in the family Chthoniidae. There are at least three described species in Verrucadithella.

== Species ==
These three species belong to the genus Verrucadithella:

- Verrucadithella dilatimana (Redikorzev, 1924)
- Verrucadithella jeanneli Beier, 1935
- Verrucadithella sulcatimana Beier, 1944
