= Chelignathus =

Chelignathus Temporal range: Priabonian

Scientific classification
- Domain: Eukaryota
- Kingdom: Animalia
- Phylum: Arthropoda
- Subphylum: Chelicerata
- Class: Arachnida
- Order: Pseudoscorpiones
- Family: Tridenchthoniidae
- Genus: †Chelignathus; Menge, 1854
- Species: †C. kochii

Binomial name
- †Chelignathus kochii Menge, 1854

Extinct genus of pseudoscorpions

Chelignathus is an extinct genus of pseudoscorpion in the family Tridenchthoniidae. There is one described species in Chelignathus, C. kochii.
