= Staurogyne minarum =

Scientific classification
- Kingdom: Plantae
- Clade: Tracheophytes
- Clade: Angiosperms
- Clade: Eudicots
- Clade: Asterids
- Order: Lamiales
- Family: Acanthaceae
- Genus: Staurogyne
- Species: S. minarum

Binomial name
- Staurogyne minarum (Nees) Kuntze (1891)

Synonyms
- Ebermaiera minarum Nees (1847); Poecilocnemis minarum Mart. (1847)

Species of flowering plant

Staurogyne minarum is a species of flowering plant native to Brazilian cerrado ecoregion. It is a shrub native to Minas Gerais state.
