= Staurogyne repens =

Scientific classification
- Kingdom: Plantae
- Clade: Tracheophytes
- Clade: Angiosperms
- Clade: Eudicots
- Clade: Asterids
- Order: Lamiales
- Family: Acanthaceae
- Genus: Staurogyne
- Species: S. repens

Binomial name
- Staurogyne repens (Nees) Kuntze

Species of flowering plant

Staurogyne repens is a plant in the family Acanthaceae, native to Brazil and Guyana. It was formally known as Ebermaiera repens. It is widely used as a tropical aquarium plant, where it grows as a bright green carpet at the bottom of the tank.
