= Elytraria imbricata =

- Elytraria imbricata flower

Scientific classification
- Kingdom: Plantae
- Clade: Tracheophytes
- Clade: Angiosperms
- Clade: Eudicots
- Clade: Asterids
- Order: Lamiales
- Family: Acanthaceae
- Genus: Elytraria
- Species: E. imbricata

Binomial name
- Elytraria imbricata (Vahl) Pers.

Synonyms
- List: Elytraria tridentata Vahl; Justicia imbricata Vahl; Cymburus squamosus (Jacq.) Raf.; Dicliptera ramentacea Spreng. ex Nees; Elytraria amara Blanco; Elytraria apargiifolia Nees; Elytraria caulescens Ledeb.; Elytraria fasciculata Kunth; Elytraria frondosa Kunth; Elytraria microstachya Oerst.; Elytraria pachystachya Oerst.; Elytraria ramosa Kunth; Elytraria scorpioides Schult.; Elytraria squamosa (Jacq.) Lindau; Elytraria tridentata var. caulescens Nees; Elytraria tridentata var. wrightii M.Gómez; Tubiflora pachystachya (Oerst.) Kuntze; Tubiflora squamosa (Jacq.) Kuntze; Stachytarpheta squamosa (Jacq.) Vahl; Verbena squamosa Jacq.; Zappania squamosa (Jacq.) Mirb.

Species of flowering plant

Each scale-covered, multiple spike on a peduncle with one open flower at a time

Spikes among long-tapering leaf bases

Bug-eaten plants in weedy habitat

Elytraria imbricata, the purple scalystem, is a subshrub native to the American tropics sometimes extending into the subtropics. It belongs to the family Acanthaceae.

== Description ==
Purple scalystem almost looks like a vervain (Verbena), but it belongs to a completely different family. Here are key features distinguishing the species:

- Extremely variable in its growth habit, it is herbaceous and perennial. Though it may appear stemless, often it develops sharply triangular to nearly round stems up to 50 cm (20 in) tall; the stems are hairless or nearly so.
- Leaves with or without short petioles are up 13.5 cm (5 1/2 in) long and 4.8 cm (2 in) wide. When a stem is present the leaves cluster toward the tip. Blades conspicuously taper at their bases and are sharply pointed to gradually diminishing at the tips. Blades with wavy to not wavy margins are hairy only on the underside, along principle veins.
- Slender, spike-type inflorescences arise atop peduncles up to 20 cm (8 in) tall. Often the peduncle branches at the top, bearing more than one spike per plant. Each spike is conspicuously covered with overlapping, scale-like bracts up to 5.2 mm (3/16 in) long, these gradually tapering into sharp tips; flowers, and later the fruits, emerge from behind the bracts. The flower's calyces, up to 4.5 mm (3/16 in) long, are deeply 4-lobed with different-sized lobes. The strongly 2-lipped corollas, with the top lip two-lobed and the lower lip three-lobed, are blue with white and yellow spots on the lower lip. The lobes unite at their bases into a slender, somewhat curving corolla tube.
- The capsular-type fruits are up to 3.9 mm (5/32 in) long and smooth.

=== The touch-sensitive stigmas ===
Purple scalystem flowers have touch-sensitive stigmas, which are an adaptation optimizing cross-pollination and preventing self-pollination. In the untouched condition, the stigma consists of a broad, flattened lobe that folds over the anthers. When touched, the lobe rapidly unfolds, exposing the anthers with their pollen to a pollinator which may then transfer some pollen to another flower. Several minutes after being touched, the lobe slowly refolds to cover the anthers, separating the plant's pollen from its own stigma. On this page, the close-up image of a flower appears to show the lobe folded over the anthers, waiting for a pollinator's touch to unfold the lobe, exposing the anthers.

== Distribution ==
In the USA, purple scalystem occurs only in the southwestern states of Arizona, New Mexico and Texas. It is native throughout Mexico, in Haiti and Central America, and in South America from Venezuela south into Argentina. It is an introduced invasive invasive species in Equador's Galápagos Islands and the Philippines and a weed in El Salvador. It is a naturalized weed in Madagascar and southeastern Asia.

== Habitat ==
In the USA, purple scalystem is found on dry rocky slopes, banks or ledges from 1100–1500 m (3,500–5,000 ft) in elevation above sea level. In central Mexico it grows in weedy conditions in vegetation derived from various disturbed habitats at elevations of 600–1,840 m (1,970–6,040 ft). In Mexico's tropical lowland Yucatan Peninsula, the species occurs in various seasonally dry forest types and disturbed vegetation such as along roads and in agricultural fields.

== In traditional medicine ==
In Mexico, purple scalystem is much used to treat diarrhea. The whole plant is boiled in water and administered as a tea, especially to children. The same treatment also serves for numerous other ailments, from kidney and intestinal problems to vaginal infections, bleeding during childbirth and other birthing problems, and snakebite. For the latter, one drinks the tea until the smothering sensation ends. In Guatemala the plant is similarly boiled, with the tea used to treat similar problems, in addition to preventing miscarriage, to treat coughs, the dysentery, the expulsion of intestinal parasites, vomiting, and insect bites.

== Taxonomy ==
In 1797, when Martin Vahl formally described and named Elytraria imbricata under the basionym Justicia imbricata, he noted that he had seen his type specimen in the herbario Marcgravii, the Marcgrave herbarium. This herbarium belonged to Georg Marcgrave, who collected plant in South America during the 1600s.

=== Etymology ===
The genus name Elytraria derives from the Greek elytron, meaning "sheath." This refers to the protective sheathing function of the scales behind which the species' flowers arise.

The species name imbricata is based on the Latin imbrex, a name for overlapping tiles to shed rain. When Martin Vahl formally described and named Elytraria imbricata, he remarked that the taxon's floral spikes were imbricata: the botanical term "imbricate" means "overlapping in a regular pattern," as observed of the taxon's scales behind which flowers emerge.
