= Tridenchthonius =

Scientific classification
- Domain: Eukaryota
- Kingdom: Animalia
- Phylum: Arthropoda
- Subphylum: Chelicerata
- Class: Arachnida
- Order: Pseudoscorpiones
- Family: Chthoniidae
- Subfamily: Tridenchthoniinae
- Genus: Tridenchthonius; Balzan, 1887

Genus of pseudoscorpions

Tridenchthonius is a genus of pseudoscorpions in the family Chthoniidae. There are about 16 described species in Tridenchthonius.

== Species ==
These 16 species belong to the genus Tridenchthonius:

- Tridenchthonius addititius Hoff, 1950
- Tridenchthonius africanus (Beier, 1931)
- Tridenchthonius beieri Mahnert, 1983
- Tridenchthonius brasiliensis Mahnert, 1979
- Tridenchthonius buchwaldi (Tullgren, 1907)
- Tridenchthonius cubanus (Chamberlin, 1929)
- Tridenchthonius donaldi Turk, 1946
- Tridenchthonius gratus Hoff, 1963
- Tridenchthonius juxtlahuaca Chamberlin and R.V. Chamberlin, 1945
- Tridenchthonius mexicanus Chamberlin and R.V. Chamberlin, 1945
- Tridenchthonius parvidentatus (Balzan, 1887)
- Tridenchthonius parvulus Balzan, 1887
- Tridenchthonius peruanus Beier, 1955
- Tridenchthonius serrulatus (Silvestri, 1918)
- Tridenchthonius surinamus (Beier, 1931)
- Tridenchthonius trinidadensis Hoff, 1946
