= Saintpauliopsis =

Scientific classification
- Kingdom: Plantae
- Clade: Tracheophytes
- Clade: Angiosperms
- Clade: Eudicots
- Clade: Asterids
- Order: Lamiales
- Family: Acanthaceae
- Subfamily: Nelsonioideae
- Genus: Saintpauliopsis; Staner
- Species: S. lebrunii

Binomial name
- Saintpauliopsis lebrunii Staner

Synonyms
- Staurogyne lebrunii (Staner) B.L.Burtt

Species of plant

Saintpauliopsis is a monotypic genus of flowering plants belonging to the family Acanthaceae. It only contains one known species, Saintpauliopsis lebrunii.

It is native to Burundi, Gabon, Madagascar, Rwanda, Tanzania and Zaïre.

Saintpauliopsis was originally classified in the family Gesneriaceae and the genus name, meaning "similar to Saintpaulia" (now synonymized under Streptocarpus), indirectly honors Walter Le Tanneux de Saint Paul-Illaire (1860–1940), a German imperial precinct captain in German East Africa (roughly present-day Tanzania), and his father, Ulrich Maximilian von Saint Paul-Illaire (1833–1902), a German naval officer and court official. The Latin specific epithet of lebrunii refers to Belgian botanist Lebrun, Jean Paul Antoine (1906-1985). It was first described and published in Bull. Jard. Bot. État Bruxelles Vol.13 on page 8 in 1934.
