= Cryptoditha =

Scientific classification
- Kingdom: Animalia
- Phylum: Arthropoda
- Subphylum: Chelicerata
- Class: Arachnida
- Order: Pseudoscorpiones
- Family: Chthoniidae
- Subfamily: Verrucadithinae
- Genus: Cryptoditha; J. C. Chamberlin and R. V. Chamberlin, 1945

Genus of pseudoscorpions

Cryptoditha is a genus of pseudoscorpions in the family Chthoniidae. There are at least two described species in Cryptoditha.

== Species ==
These two species belong to the genus Cryptoditha:

- Cryptoditha elegans (Beier, 1931)
- Cryptoditha francisi (Feio, 1945)
