= Pycnodithella =

Scientific classification
- Domain: Eukaryota
- Kingdom: Animalia
- Phylum: Arthropoda
- Subphylum: Chelicerata
- Class: Arachnida
- Order: Pseudoscorpiones
- Family: Chthoniidae
- Subfamily: Verrucadithinae
- Genus: Pycnodithella; Beier, 1947

Genus of pseudoscorpions

Pycnodithella is a genus of pseudoscorpions in the family Chthoniidae.

== Species ==
The genus contains the following species:

- Pycnodithella abyssinica (Beier, 1944)
- Pycnodithella harveyi Kennedy, 1989
