= Staurogyne sichuanica =

Conservation status
- Endangered (IUCN 3.1)

Scientific classification
- Kingdom: Plantae
- Clade: Tracheophytes
- Clade: Angiosperms
- Clade: Eudicots
- Clade: Asterids
- Order: Lamiales
- Family: Acanthaceae
- Genus: Staurogyne
- Species: S. sichuanica

Binomial name
- Staurogyne sichuanica H.S.Lo

Species of flowering plant

Staurogyne sichuanica is a species of plant in the family Acanthaceae. It is endemic to China.
