= Tridenchthonius africanus =

Scientific classification
- Domain: Eukaryota
- Kingdom: Animalia
- Phylum: Arthropoda
- Subphylum: Chelicerata
- Class: Arachnida
- Order: Pseudoscorpiones
- Family: Chthoniidae
- Genus: Tridenchthonius
- Species: T. africanus

Binomial name
- Tridenchthonius africanus (Beier, 1931)

Species of pseudoscorpion

Tridenchthonius africanus is a species of pseudoscorpion in the family Tridenchthoniidae.
