= Staurogyne bicolor =

Conservation status
- Vulnerable (IUCN 3.1)

Scientific classification
- Kingdom: Plantae
- Clade: Embryophytes
- Clade: Tracheophytes
- Clade: Angiosperms
- Clade: Eudicots
- Clade: Asterids
- Order: Lamiales
- Family: Acanthaceae
- Genus: Staurogyne
- Species: S. bicolor

Binomial name
- Staurogyne bicolor (Mildbr.) Champl.

Synonyms
- Homotypic Synonyms: Neozenkerina bicolor Mildbr.

Species of flowering plant

Staurogyne bicolor is a species of flowering plant in the family Acanthaceae. It is endemic to Cameroon. Its natural habitat is subtropical or tropical moist lowland forests. It is threatened by habitat loss.
