= Typhloditha =

Scientific classification
- Domain: Eukaryota
- Kingdom: Animalia
- Phylum: Arthropoda
- Subphylum: Chelicerata
- Class: Arachnida
- Order: Pseudoscorpiones
- Family: Chthoniidae
- Subfamily: Tridenchthoniinae
- Genus: Typhloditha; Beier, 1955

Genus of pseudoscorpions

Typhloditha is a genus of pseudoscorpions in the family Chthoniidae. There are at least three described species in Typhloditha.

== Species ==
These three species belong to the genus Typhloditha:

- Typhloditha anophthalma Beier, 1955
- Typhloditha minima Beier, 1959
- Typhloditha termitophila Beier, 1964
