= Ephippiochthonius =

Scientific classification
- Kingdom: Animalia
- Phylum: Arthropoda
- Subphylum: Chelicerata
- Class: Arachnida
- Order: Pseudoscorpiones
- Family: Chthoniidae
- Genus: Ephippiochthonius; Beir, 1930

Type species
- Scorpio tetrachelatus Preyssler,, 1790

Genus of pseudoscorpions

Ephippiochthonius is a genus of pseudoscorpions in the Chthoniidae family. It was described in 1930 by Austrian arachnologist Max Beier. First introduced as a subgenus of Chthonius by Carl Ludwig Koch in 1843, it was subsequently elevated to genus level by Juan Antonio Zaragoza in 2017.

== Species ==
The genus contains the following species:

- Ephippiochthonius aeneae (Gardini, 2013)
- Ephippiochthonius aguileraorum (Carabajal Márquez, García Carrillo & Rodríguez Fernández, 2000)
- Ephippiochthonius aini Zaragoza, 2017
- Ephippiochthonius altamurae (Gardini, 2013)
- Ephippiochthonius amatei (Carabajal Márquez, García Carrillo & Rodríguez Fernández, 2001)
- Ephippiochthonius anatolicus (Beier, 1969)
- Ephippiochthonius andalucia Zaragoza, 2017
- Ephippiochthonius anophthalmus (Ellingsen, 1908)
- Ephippiochthonius apulicus (Beier, 1958)
- Ephippiochthonius atlantis (Mahnert, 1980)
- Ephippiochthonius aurouxi Zaragoza, 2017
- Ephippiochthonius balearicus (Mahnert, 1977)
- Ephippiochthonius bellesi (Mahnert, 1989)
- Ephippiochthonius benimaquia Zaragoza, 2017
- Ephippiochthonius bidentatus (Beier, 1938)
- Ephippiochthonius boldorii (Beier, 1934)
- Ephippiochthonius bolivari (Beier, 1930)
- Ephippiochthonius borissketi (Ćurčić & Sarbu, 2014)
- Ephippiochthonius cabreriensis (Mahnert, 1993)
- Ephippiochthonius caceresi Zaragoza, 2017
- Ephippiochthonius castellonensis Zaragoza, 2017
- Ephippiochthonius catalonicus (Beier, 1939)
- Ephippiochthonius caucasicus Nassirkhani, Snegovaya & Chumachenko, 2019
- Ephippiochthonius chius (Schawaller, 1990)
- Ephippiochthonius cikolae (Ćurčić & Rađa, 2010)
- Ephippiochthonius civitatisveti (Ćurčić & Radja, 2011)
- Ephippiochthonius comasi Zaragoza, 2017
- Ephippiochthonius concii (Beier, 1953)
- Ephippiochthonius corcyraeus (Mahnert, 1976)
- Ephippiochthonius corsicus (Callaini, 1981)
- Ephippiochthonius creticus (Mahnert, 1980)
- Ephippiochthonius daedaleus (Mahnert, 1980)
- Ephippiochthonius distinguendus (Beier, 1930)
- Ephippiochthonius elymus (Gardini, 2013)
- Ephippiochthonius etruscus (Gardini, 2013)
- Ephippiochthonius fadriquei Zaragoza, 2017
- Ephippiochthonius fuscimanus (Simon, 1900)
- Ephippiochthonius galcerani Zaragoza, 2017
- Ephippiochthonius gallii (Gardini, 2013)
- Ephippiochthonius gasparoi (Gardini, 1989)
- Ephippiochthonius genuensis (Gardini, 1990)
- Ephippiochthonius gestroi (Simon, 1896)
- Ephippiochthonius gibbus (Beier, 1953)
- Ephippiochthonius girgentiensis (Mahnert, 1982)
- Ephippiochthonius giustii (Callaini, 1981)
- Ephippiochthonius gonzalezi Zaragoza, 2017
- Ephippiochthonius grafittii (Gardini, 1981)
- Ephippiochthonius henderickxi Zaragoza, 2017
- Ephippiochthonius hiberus (Beier, 1930)
- Ephippiochthonius hispanus (Beier, 1930)
- Ephippiochthonius ibiza Zaragoza, 2017
- Ephippiochthonius insularis (Beier, 1938)
- Ephippiochthonius intemelius (Gardini, 2013)
- Ephippiochthonius iranicus (Beier, 1971)
- Ephippiochthonius juliae Kolesnikov, Przhiboro & Turbanov, 2023
- Ephippiochthonius kabylicus (Callaini, 1983)
- Ephippiochthonius kemza (Ćurčić, Lee & Makarov, 1993)
- Ephippiochthonius kewi (Gabbutt, 1966)
- Ephippiochthonius kupalo (Ćurčić, 1997)
- Ephippiochthonius lagadini (Ćurčić & Rađa, 2011)
- Ephippiochthonius latellai (Gardini, 2013)
- Ephippiochthonius ligur (Gardini, 2013)
- Ephippiochthonius longesetosus (Mahnert, 1976)
- Ephippiochthonius lucanus (Callaini, 1984)
- Ephippiochthonius lychnidis (Ćurčić, 1997)
- Ephippiochthonius magrinii (Gardini, 2013)
- Ephippiochthonius mahnerti (Zaragoza, 1984)
- Ephippiochthonius mariolae (Carabajal Márquez, García Carrillo & Rodríguez Fernández, 2001)
- Ephippiochthonius maroccanus (Mahnert, 1980)
- Ephippiochthonius masoae Zaragoza, 2017
- Ephippiochthonius mayorali (Carabajal Márquez, García Carrillo & Rodríguez Fernández, 2001)
- Ephippiochthonius messapicus (Gardini, 2013)
- Ephippiochthonius metohicus (Ćurčić, 2011)
- Ephippiochthonius microtuberculatus (Hadži, 1937)
- Ephippiochthonius minous (Mahnert, 1980)
  - Ephippiochthonius minous minous (Mahnert, 1980)
  - Ephippiochthonius minous peramae (Mahnert, 1980)
- Ephippiochthonius monguzzii (Gardini, 2013)
- Ephippiochthonius nanus (Beier, 1953)
- Ephippiochthonius negarinae (Nassirkhani & Shoushtari, 2015)
- Ephippiochthonius nerjaensis (Carabajal Márquez, García Carrillo & Rodríguez Fernández, 2001)
- Ephippiochthonius nidicola (Mahnert, 1979)
- Ephippiochthonius nudipes (Mahnert, 1982)
- Ephippiochthonius oryzis Kolesnikov, Turbanov & Gongalsky, 2019
- Ephippiochthonius pieltaini (Beier, 1930)
- Ephippiochthonius platakisi (Mahnert, 1980)
- Ephippiochthonius pliginskyi Turbanov & Kolesnikov, 2021
- Ephippiochthonius ponsi (Mahnert, 1993)
- Ephippiochthonius portugalensis Zaragoza, 2017
- Ephippiochthonius poseidonis (Gardini, 1993)
- Ephippiochthonius pyrenaicus (Beier, 1934)
- Ephippiochthonius remyi (Heurtault, 1975)
- Ephippiochthonius rhizon (Ćurčić, 2013)
- Ephippiochthonius riberai Zaragoza, 2017
- Ephippiochthonius rimicola (Mahnert, 1993)
- Ephippiochthonius rogoi (Ćurčić, Rađa & Dimitrijević, 2008)
- Ephippiochthonius romanicus (Beier, 1935)
- Ephippiochthonius sacer (Beier, 1963)
- Ephippiochthonius samius (Mahnert, 1982)
- Ephippiochthonius sardous (Gardini, 2008)
- Ephippiochthonius sarmaticus Kolesnikov, Turbanov & Gongalsky, 2019
- Ephippiochthonius schmalfussi (Schawaller, 1990)
- Ephippiochthonius scythicus (Georgescu & Cǎpuşe, 1994)
- Ephippiochthonius serbicus (Hadži, 1937)
- Ephippiochthonius serengei Zaragoza, 2017
- Ephippiochthonius sevai Zaragoza, 2017
- Ephippiochthonius siculus (Beier, 1961)
- Ephippiochthonius siscoensis (Heurtault, 1975)
- Ephippiochthonius sulphureus (Gardini, 2013)
- Ephippiochthonius tarraconensis Zaragoza, 2017
- Ephippiochthonius tauroscythicus Turbanov & Kolesnikov, 2021
- Ephippiochthonius tetrachelatus (Preyssler, 1790)
- Ephippiochthonius timacensis (Ćurčić, Dimitrijević & Stojanović, 2012)
- Ephippiochthonius troglophilus (Beier, 1930)
- Ephippiochthonius tuberculatus (Hadži, 1937)
- Ephippiochthonius tyrrhenicus (Gardini, 2013)
- Ephippiochthonius vachoni (Heurtault-Rossi, 1963)
- Ephippiochthonius vicenae Zaragoza, 2017
- Ephippiochthonius vid (Ćurčić, 1997)
- Ephippiochthonius virginicus (Chamberlin, 1929)
- Ephippiochthonius volkeri Turbanov & Kolesnikov, 2021
- Ephippiochthonius zaballosi Zaragoza, 2017
- Ephippiochthonius zoiai (Gardini, 1990)
