= Ditha =

Scientific classification
- Kingdom: Animalia
- Phylum: Arthropoda
- Subphylum: Chelicerata
- Class: Arachnida
- Order: Pseudoscorpiones
- Family: Chthoniidae
- Subfamily: Tridenchthoniinae
- Genus: Ditha; J. C. Chamberlin, 1929

Genus of pseudoscorpions

Ditha is a genus of pseudoscorpions in the family Chthoniidae. There are about 14 described species in Ditha.

== Species ==
These 14 species belong to the genus Ditha:

- Ditha elegans Chamberlin, 1929
- Ditha laosana Beier, 1951
- Ditha latimana (Beier, 1931)
- Ditha loricata Beier, 1965
- Ditha marcusensis (Morikawa, 1952)
- Ditha novaeguineae Beier, 1965
- Ditha ogasawarensis Satô, 1981
- Ditha pahangica Beier, 1955
- Ditha palauensis Beier, 1957
- Ditha philippinensis Chamberlin, 1929
- Ditha proxima (Beier, 1951)
- Ditha sinuata (Tullgren, 1901)
- Ditha sumatraensis (Chamberlin, 1923)
- Ditha tonkinensis Beier, 1951
