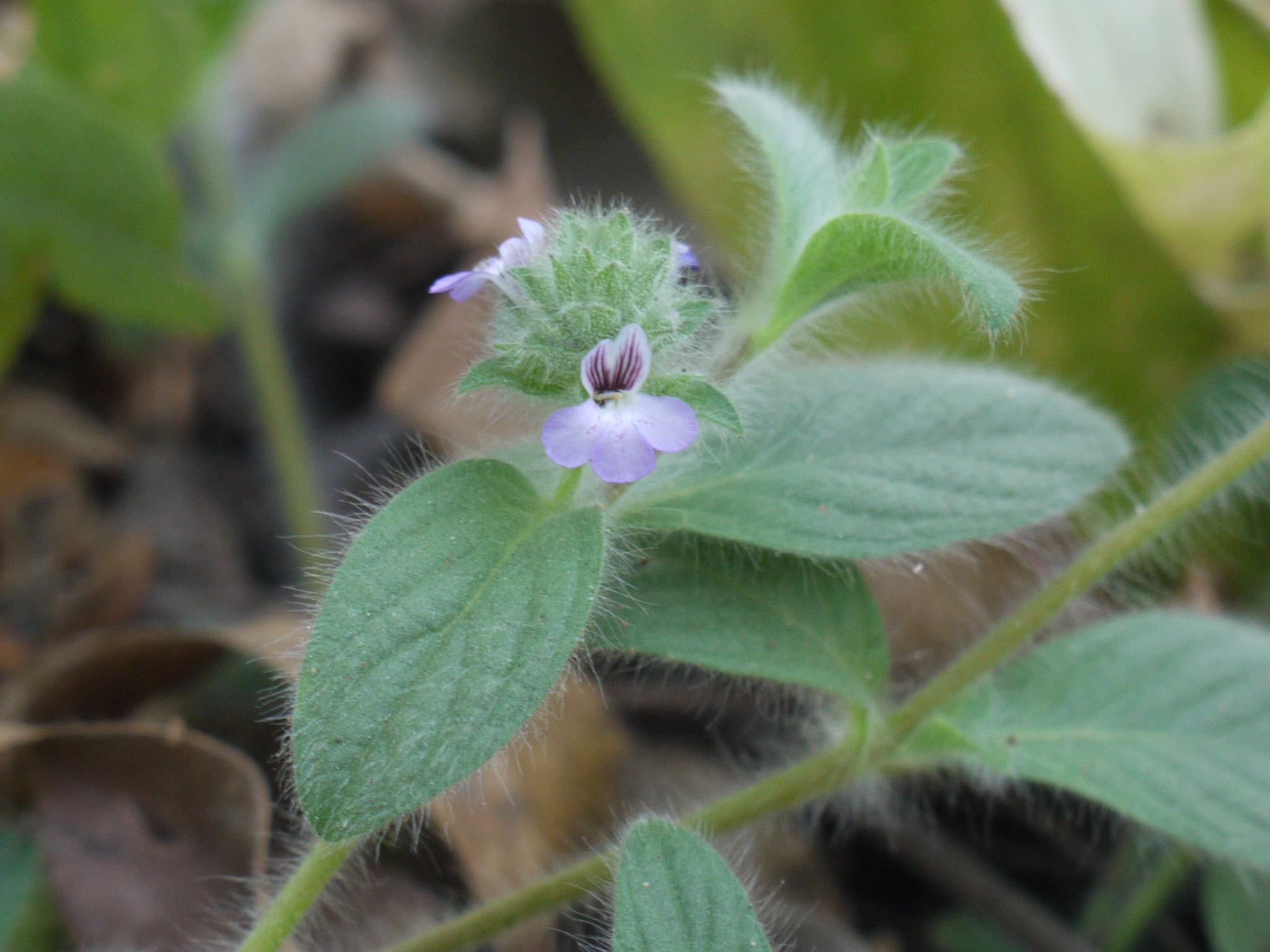
- Nelsonia canescens

Scientific classification
- Kingdom: Plantae
- Clade: Tracheophytes
- Clade: Angiosperms
- Clade: Eudicots
- Clade: Asterids
- Order: Lamiales
- Family: Acanthaceae
- Subfamily: Nelsonioideae
- Genus: Nelsonia; R.Br. (1810)

= Nelsonia (plant) =

Genus of flowering plants

Nelsonia is a genus of plants in the family Acanthaceae. They can be found in tropical: Africa (including Madagascar), Latin America, south-east Asia and Australia.

== Species ==
As of February 2024, Plants of the World Online accepts three species:

- Nelsonia canescens (Lam.) Spreng.
- Nelsonia gracilis Vollesen
- Nelsonia smithii Oerst.

=== Synonyms and obsolete taxa ===
The Plant List (9 October 2012) listed the following species names:

- Nelsonia albicans Kunth = Nelsonia canescens (Lam.) Spreng. (1824)
- Nelsonia brunelloides (Lam.) Kuntze = Nelsonia canescens (Lam.) Spreng. (1824)
- Nelsonia campestris R.Br. = Nelsonia canescens (Lam.) Spreng. (1824)
- Nelsonia campestris var. vestita (Roem. & Schult.) C.B. Clarke = Nelsonia canescens (Lam.) Spreng. (1824)
- Nelsonia canescens var. smithii (Oerst.) E.Hossain = Nelsonia smithii Oerst. (1854)
- Nelsonia canescens var. vestita (Roem. & Schult.) E. Hossain = Nelsonia canescens (Lam.) Spreng. (1824)
- Nelsonia hirsuta (Vahl) Roem. & Schult. = Nelsonia canescens (Lam.) Spreng. (1824)
- Nelsonia lamiifolia (Roxb.) Spreng. = Nelsonia canescens (Lam.) Spreng. (1824)
- Nelsonia origanoides (Vahl) Roem. & Schult. = Nelsonia canescens (Lam.) Spreng. (1824)
- Nelsonia pohlii Nees = Nelsonia canescens (Lam.) Spreng. (1824)
- Nelsonia rotundifolia R.Br. = Nelsonia canescens (Lam.) Spreng. (1824)
- Nelsonia senegalensis Oerst. = Nelsonia canescens (Lam.) Spreng. (1824)
- Nelsonia tomentosa A. Dietr. = Nelsonia canescens (Lam.) Spreng. (1824)
- Nelsonia vestita Schult. = Nelsonia canescens (Lam.) Spreng. (1824)
- Nelsonia villosa Oerst. = Nelsonia canescens (Lam.) Spreng. (1824)
