= Staurogyne elegans =

Scientific classification
- Kingdom: Plantae
- Clade: Tracheophytes
- Clade: Angiosperms
- Clade: Eudicots
- Clade: Asterids
- Order: Lamiales
- Family: Acanthaceae
- Genus: Staurogyne
- Species: S. elegans

Binomial name
- Staurogyne elegans (Nees) Kuntze (1891)

Synonyms
- Ebermaiera elegans Nees (1847); Stiftia elegans Pohl ex Nees (1847)

Species of flowering plant

Staurogyne elegans is a species of flowering plant native to Brazilian cerrado vegetation. It is a subshrub or shrub native to Minas Gerais state. This plant is cited in Flora Brasiliensis by Carl Friedrich Philipp von Martius.
