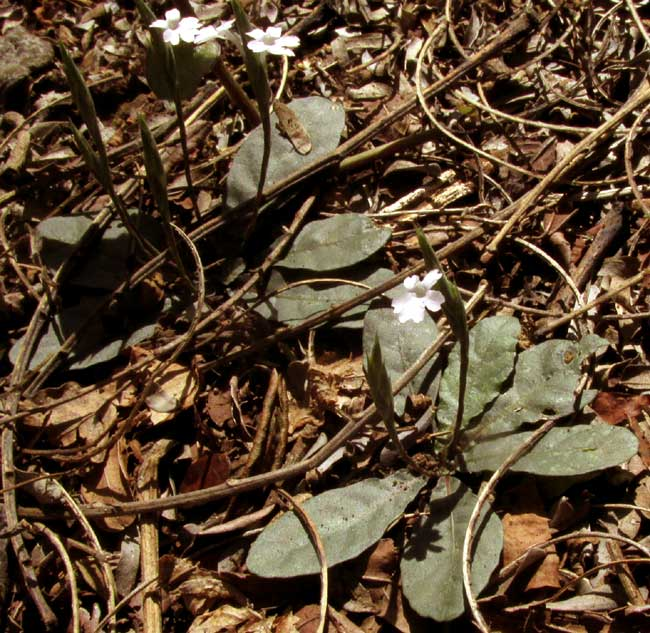

Scientific classification
- Kingdom: Plantae
- Clade: Embryophytes
- Clade: Tracheophytes
- Clade: Spermatophytes
- Clade: Angiosperms
- Clade: Eudicots
- Clade: Asterids
- Order: Lamiales
- Family: Acanthaceae
- Genus: Elytraria
- Species: E. bromoides

Binomial name
- Elytraria bromoides Oerst.

Synonyms
- Elytraria acuminata (Small) Cory; Tubflora acuminata (Small)

= Elytraria bromoides =

Species of plant

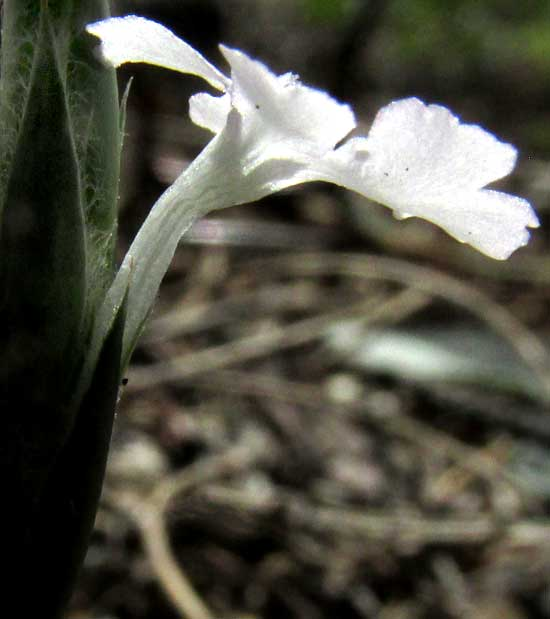
Wheatspike scalystem flower side view

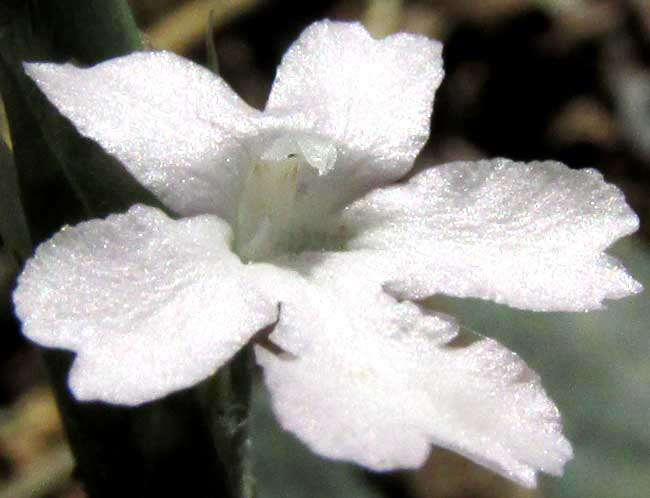
Wheatspike scalystem flower front view

Elytraria bromoides, the wheatspike scalystem, is a species of perennial, herbaceous plant of the Americas. It belongs to the family Acanthaceae.

== Description ==
Wheatspike scalystem is easily recognized by these distinctive and features:

- Leaves forming the rosette are widest above their centers, with bases gradually diminishing toward the rosette's center, and their tips are rounded to barely pointed. Margins have no indentations or teeth, else are weakly wavy to scalloped, and up to 15 cm (5.9 in) long and 3.8 cm (1.5 in) wide.
- The spike-like inflorescences overlapping, spiraling bracts each have behind them a central, terminal flower which opens first, with two younger flowers developing below it; it is a "dichasial spike". The spike's peduncle can be up to 15 cm (5.9 in) long, though usually about half that, and the scaly flowering part is shorter than the peduncle.
- Flowers have white to pinkish or bluish corollas exhibiting distinct upper and lower lobes (they're "zygomorphic") and are up to 14 mm (0.55 in) long. The upper lobe is itself two-lobed while the lower lobe is three-lobed, and all the smaller lobes are shallowly notched at their tips. There are only 2 stamens, above which a tongue-like, white stigma curves when the flower is open.
- Fruits are capsules up to 7 mm (0.3 in) long, producing wrinkled seeds up to 1 mm (0.04 in) long.

== Distribution ==
Wheatspike scalystem occurs from the southernmost part of the US state of Texas south through the eastern Mexican states, including the Yucatan Peninsula, into Guatemala.

== Habitat ==
In the US state of Texas wheatspike scalystem occurs in sandy soil. In east-central Mexico's Eastern Sierra Madre foothills it occurs in dry scrub, tropical forests with deciduous or largely deciduous trees, and oak forest at elevations of 300–1,400 m (980–4,600 ft). Also in the Eastern Sierra Madres, it's found on lava lows at 400–900 m (1,300–3,000 ft) in elevation. Images on this page show plants on a seldom-used, usually shaded trail in thin soil atop limestone in a dry forest in north-central Yucatán, México, at an elevation of 39 m (128 ft).

== Ecology ==
In northeastern Mexico, at elevations from 210 to 1,372 m (689 to 4,500 ft), wheatspike scalystem flowers throughout the year. In the Mexican lowlands of the Yucatan Peninsula, it flowers and fruits in June and July.

A study in Mexico found that wheatspike scalystem survives in rural settings, but not in sites designated as having low, moderate or high urbanisation.

== In traditional medicine ==
In Mexico's Yucatan Peninsula, wheatspike scalystem has been used against insect bites. In the Mexican state of Veracruz, it has served as a treatment or anemia.

== Taxonomy ==
Elytraria bromoides first was published by the Danish botanist Anders Sandøe Ørsted in 1854. The name Ørsted also is written as Örsted and Orsted. Accompanying his Latin description of the species he writes in Danish that Prof. Liebmann found it at Papantla on the Rio Nautla, at Hacienda de Santa Barbara, with fruit from March to May.

Half a century later, in 1903, John Kunkel Small published the same taxon as a new species under the name Tubiflora acuminata. In 1936, Small's taxon was transferred to the genus Elytraria. Now both later names are regarded as synonyms of Elytraria bromoides.

=== Etymology ===
The genus name Elytraria is based on the Greek ελύτρον, elytron, which means "sheath". This refers to the bracts which arise below the flowers, sheathing the rachis.

The species name bromoides is a New Latin construction in which the suffix -oides, based on the Greek oeidēs, means "resembling". In plant taxonomy bromoides means "similar to brome grass, the genus Bromus," to which the inflorescences of Elytraria species with their overlapping scales could be, with imagination, considered vaguely similar.
