= Neochthonius =

Scientific classification
- Kingdom: Animalia
- Phylum: Arthropoda
- Subphylum: Chelicerata
- Class: Arachnida
- Order: Pseudoscorpiones
- Family: Chthoniidae
- Genus: Neochthonius; Chamberlin, 1929

Genus of spiders

Neochthonius is a genus of pseudoscorpions belonging to the family Chthoniidae.

Species:

- Neochthonius amplus (Schuster, 1962)
- Neochthonius imperialis Muchmore, 1996
- Neochthonius stanfordianus Chamberlin, 1929
- Neochthonius troglodytes Muchmore, 1969
