= Paraliochthonius =

Scientific classification
- Kingdom: Animalia
- Phylum: Arthropoda
- Subphylum: Chelicerata
- Class: Arachnida
- Order: Pseudoscorpiones
- Family: Chthoniidae
- Genus: Paraliochthonius; Beir, 1956

Type species
- Chthonius singularis Menozzi, 1924

Synonyms
- Morikawia Chamberlin, 1962; Stygiochthonius Carabajal Márquez, Garcia Carrillo & Rodríguez Fernández, 2001

Genus of pseudoscorpions

Paraliochthonius is a genus of pseudoscorpions in the Chthoniidae family. It was described in 1956 by Austrian arachnologist Max Beier.

== Species ==
The genus contains the following species:

- Paraliochthonius azanius Mahnert, 1986
- Paraliochthonius barrancoi (Carabajal Márquez, García Carrillo & Rodríguez Fernández, 2001)
- Paraliochthonius canariensis Vachon, 1961
- Paraliochthonius carpenteri Muchmore, 1984
- Paraliochthonius cavalensis Zaragoza, 2004
- Paraliochthonius darwini Harvey, 2009
- Paraliochthonius galapagensis Mahnert, 2014
- Paraliochthonius hoestlandti Vachon, 1960
- Paraliochthonius insulae Hoff, 1963
- Paraliochthonius johnstoni (Chamberlin, 1923)
- Paraliochthonius litoralis Mahnert, 2014
- Paraliochthonius martini Mahnert, 1989
- Paraliochthonius mexicanus Muchmore, 1972
- Paraliochthonius mirus Mahnert, 2002
- Paraliochthonius pecki Mahnert, 2014
- Paraliochthonius puertoricensis Muchmore, 1967
- Paraliochthonius quirosi Bedoya-Roqueme, 2015
- Paraliochthonius rupicola Mahnert, 2014
- Paraliochthonius setiger (Mahnert, 1997)
- Paraliochthonius singularis (Menozzi, 1924)
- Paraliochthonius superstes (Mahnert, 1986)
- Paraliochthonius takashimai (Morikawa, 1958)
- Paraliochthonius tenebrarum Mahnert, 1989
- Paraliochthonius vachoni Harvey, 2009
- Paraliochthonius weygoldti Muchmore, 1967

=== Fossil species ===
- †Paraliochthonius miomaya Judson, 2016
