= Verrucaditha =

Scientific classification
- Kingdom: Animalia
- Phylum: Arthropoda
- Subphylum: Chelicerata
- Class: Arachnida
- Order: Pseudoscorpiones
- Family: Chthoniidae
- Tribe: Verrucadithini
- Genus: Verrucaditha; J. C. Chamberlin, 1929

Genus of pseudoscorpions

Verrucaditha is a monotypic genus of pseudoscorpions in the family Chthoniidae. Its sole described species is Verrucaditha spinosa.
