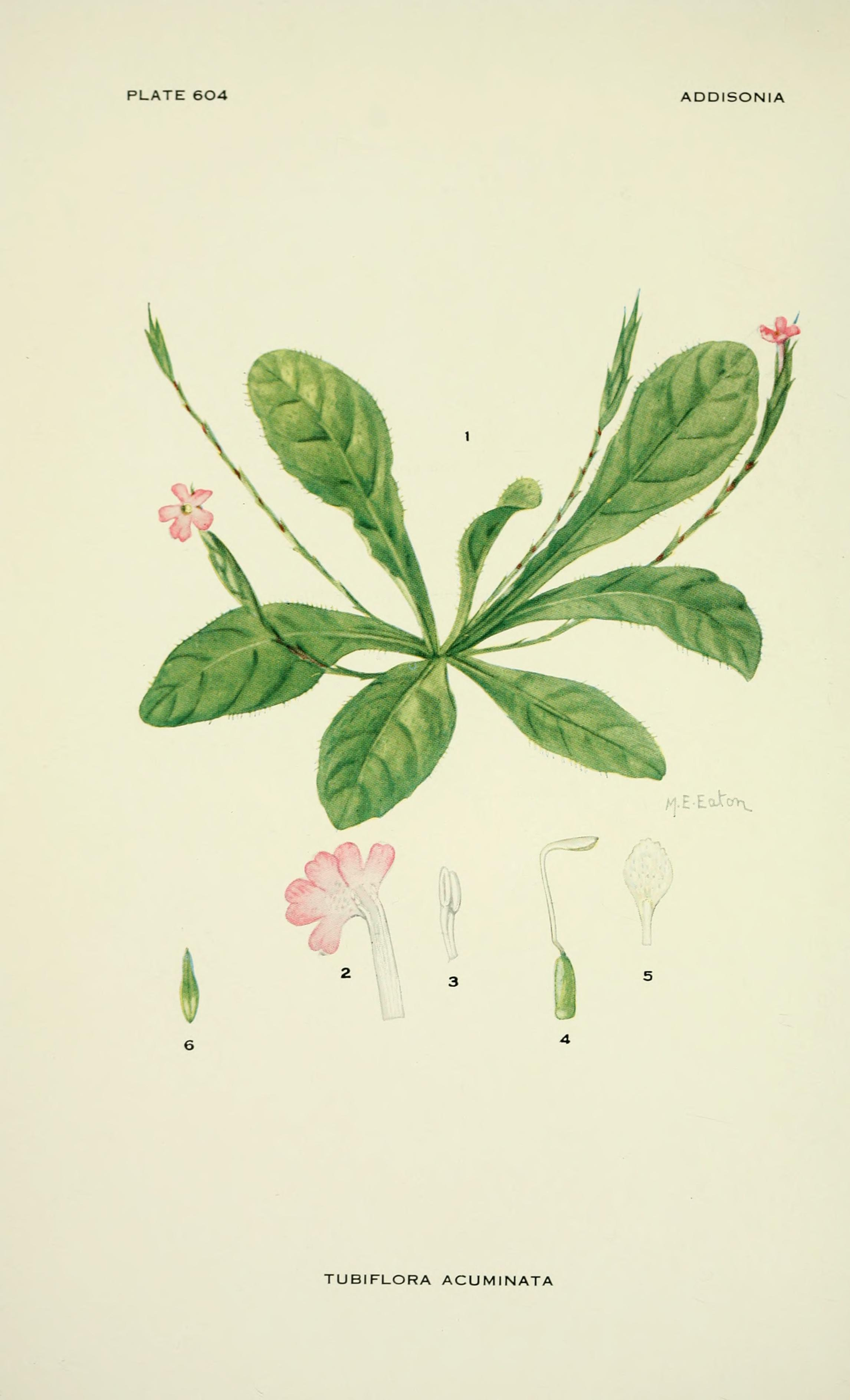
- Elytraria bromoides botanical illustration

Scientific classification
- Kingdom: Plantae
- Clade: Embryophytes
- Clade: Tracheophytes
- Clade: Angiosperms
- Clade: Eudicots
- Clade: Asterids
- Order: Lamiales
- Family: Acanthaceae
- Subfamily: Nelsonioideae
- Genus: Elytraria; Michx. (1803)

Species
- See text

Synonyms
- Cymburus Raf. (1837), nom. illeg.; Tubiflora J.F.Gmel. (1791)

= Elytraria =

Genus of flowering plants

Elytraria, scalystem, is a genus of flowering plants in the family Acanthaceae, with a pantropical distribution. They tend to lack stems. Includes 22 species.

== Species ==
Currently accepted species include:

- Elytraria acaulis (L.f.) Lindau
- Elytraria bissei H.Dietr.
- Elytraria bromoides Oerst.
- Elytraria caroliniensis (J.F.Gmel.) Pers.
- Elytraria cubana Alain
- Elytraria filicaulis Borhidi & O.Muñiz
- Elytraria imbricata (Vahl) Pers.
- Elytraria ivorensis Dokosi
- Elytraria klugii Leonard
- Elytraria macrophylla Leonard
- Elytraria madagascariensis (Benoist) E.Hossain
- Elytraria marginata Vahl
- Elytraria maritima J.K.Morton
- Elytraria mexicana Fryxell & S.D.Koch
- Elytraria minor Dokosi
- Elytraria nodosa E.Hossain
- Elytraria planifolia Leonard
- Elytraria prolifera Leonard
- Elytraria serpens Greuter & R.Rankin
- Elytraria shaferi (P.Wilson) Leonard
- Elytraria spathulifolia Borhidi & O.Muñiz
- Elytraria tuberosa Leonard
