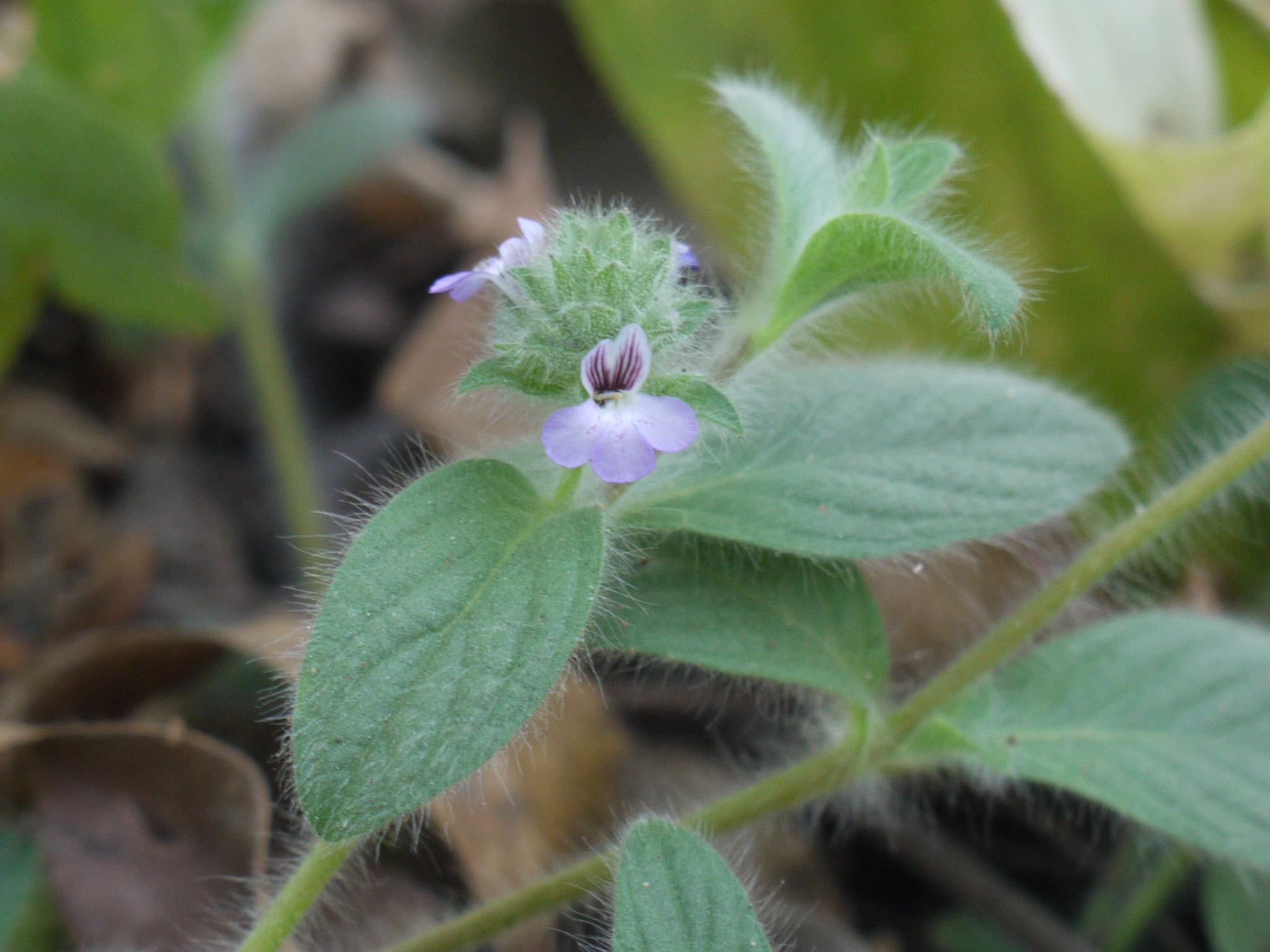

Scientific classification
- Kingdom: Plantae
- Clade: Embryophytes
- Clade: Tracheophytes
- Clade: Spermatophytes
- Clade: Angiosperms
- Clade: Eudicots
- Clade: Asterids
- Order: Lamiales
- Family: Acanthaceae
- Genus: Nelsonia
- Species: N. canescens

Binomial name
- Nelsonia canescens (Lam.) Spreng.

Synonyms
- Zahlbrucknera repens Pohl ex Nees; Ruellia eriostachya Boj. ex Nees; Ruellia diffusa Vell. Rhaphidospora vestita G. Don; Nelsonia villosa Oerst. Nelsonia vestita Schult. Nelsonia tomentosa A. Dietr. Nelsonia senegalensis Oerst. Nelsonia rotundifolia R. Br. Nelsonia pohlii Nees; Nelsonia origanoides Roem. & Schult. Nelsonia nummulariifolia Roem. & Schult. Nelsonia lamiifolia Spreng. Nelsonia campestris var. vestita (Schult.) A.B.M. Enayet Hossain; Nelsonia albicans Kunth; Justicia vestita Schult. Justicia tomentosa Roxb. Justicia pusilla Pohl ex Nees; Justicia pentasticha Buch.-Ham. ex Wall. Justicia origanoides Vahl; Justicia nummularifolia Vahl; Justicia lamifolia koen. ex Roxb. Justicia canescens Lam. Justicia bengalensis Spreng. Justicia ajugoides Buch.-Ham. ex Nees; Dianthera tomentosa Roxb. ex C. B. Cl. Acanthodium spicatum Acerbi ex Nees

= Nelsonia canescens =

Species of flowering plant

Nelsonia canescens is a herbaceous plant species in the family Acanthaceae, with a substantial number of similar plant specimens now identified as synonyms.

== Gallery ==
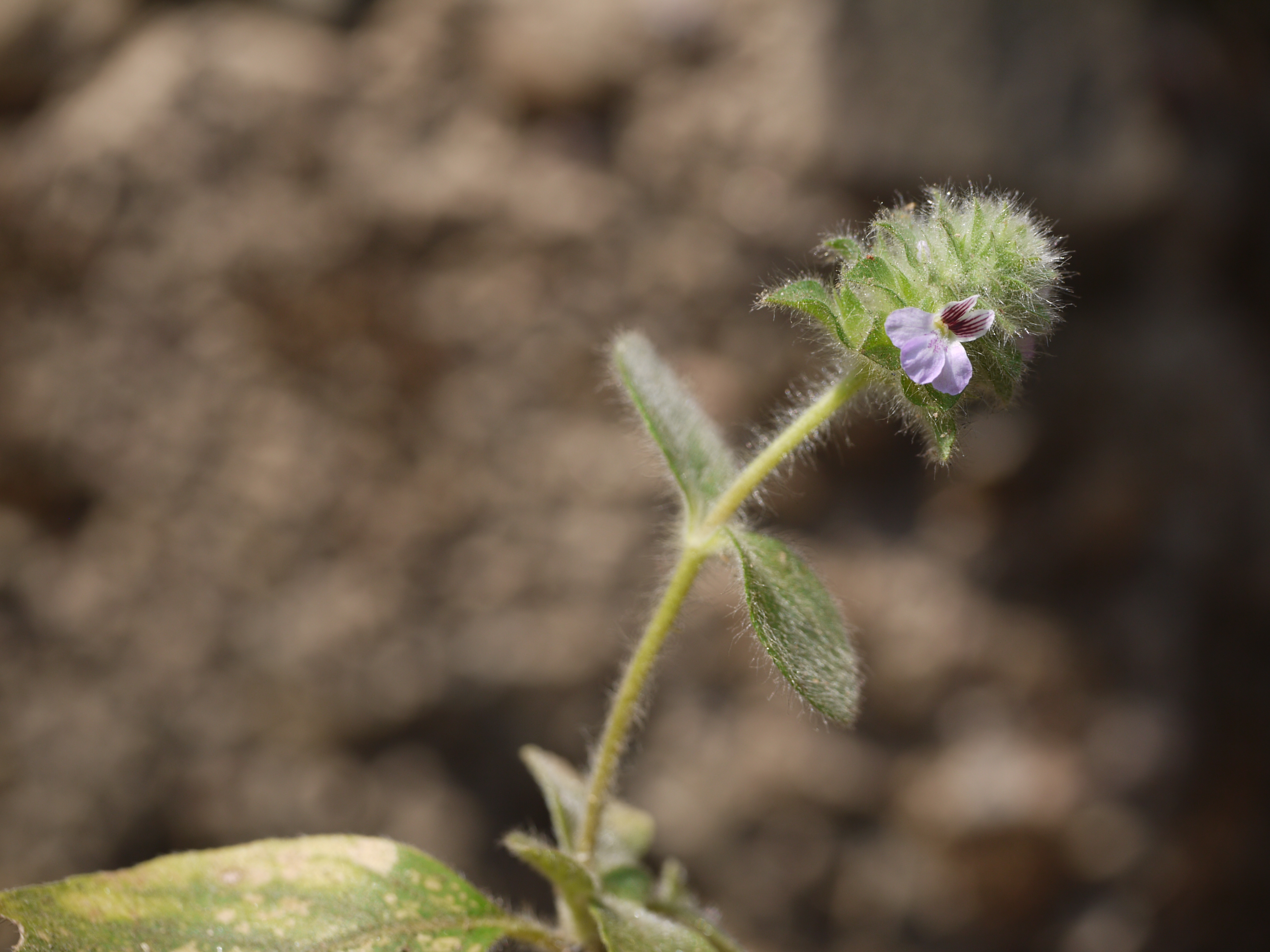

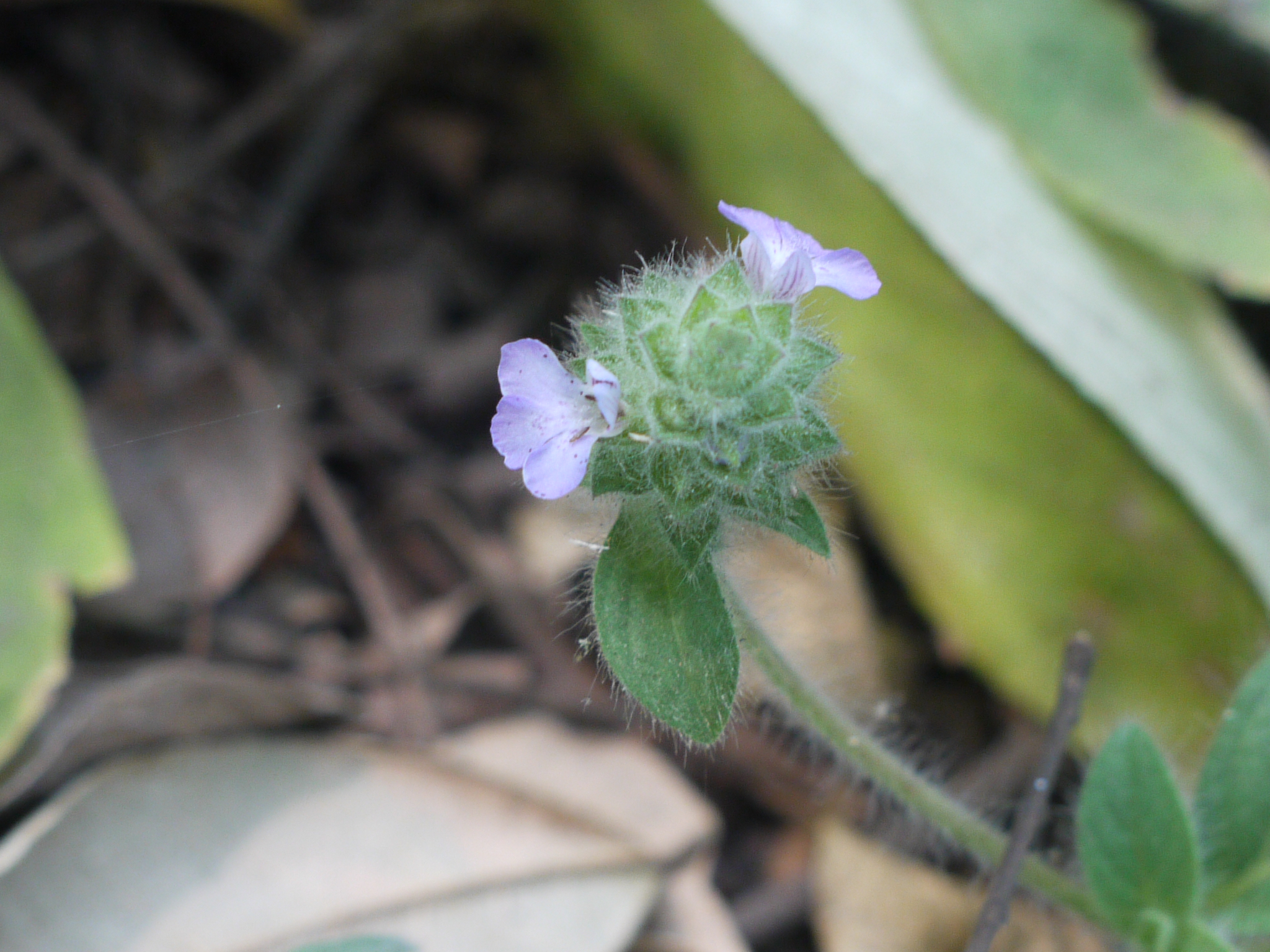

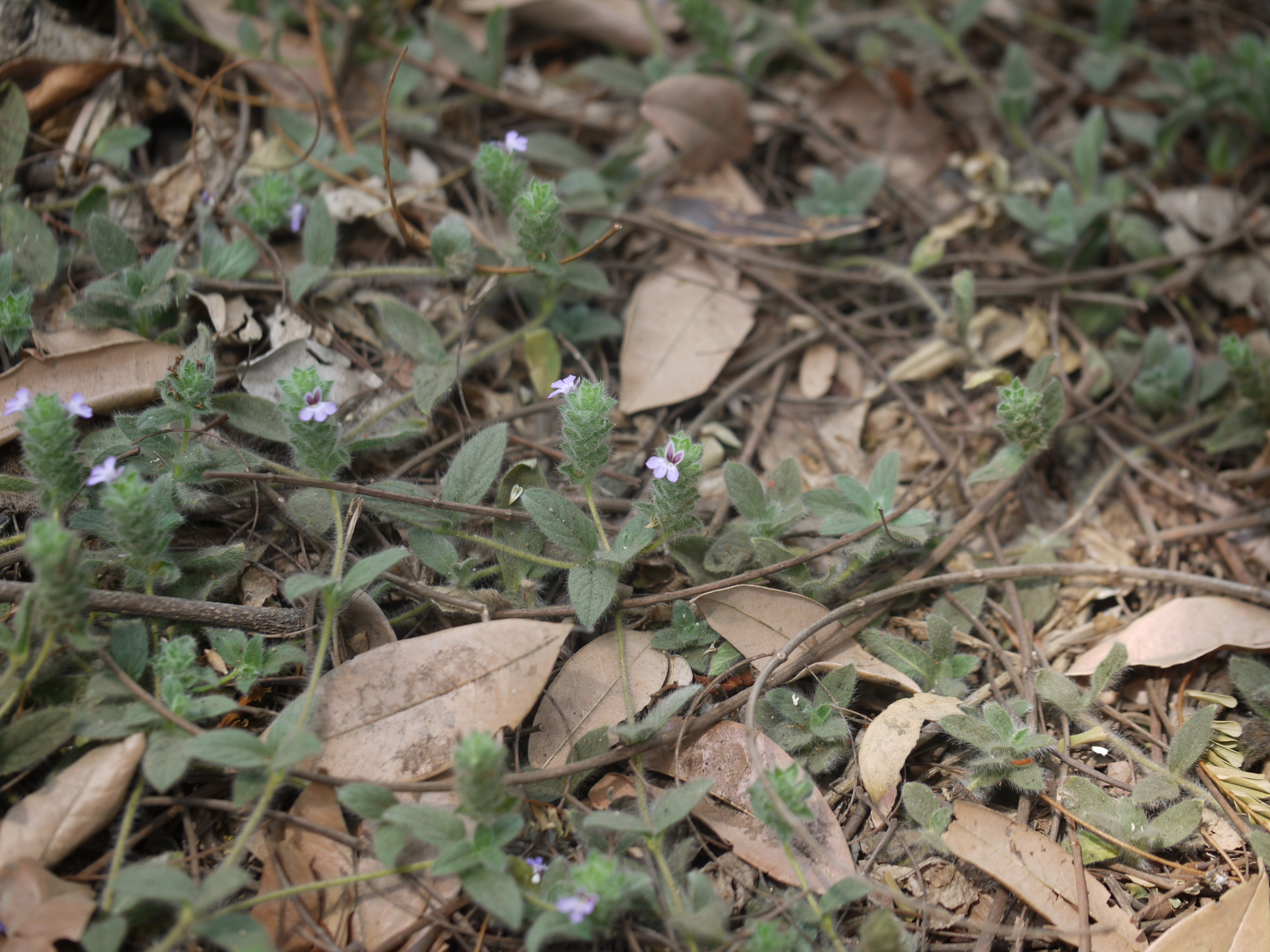
