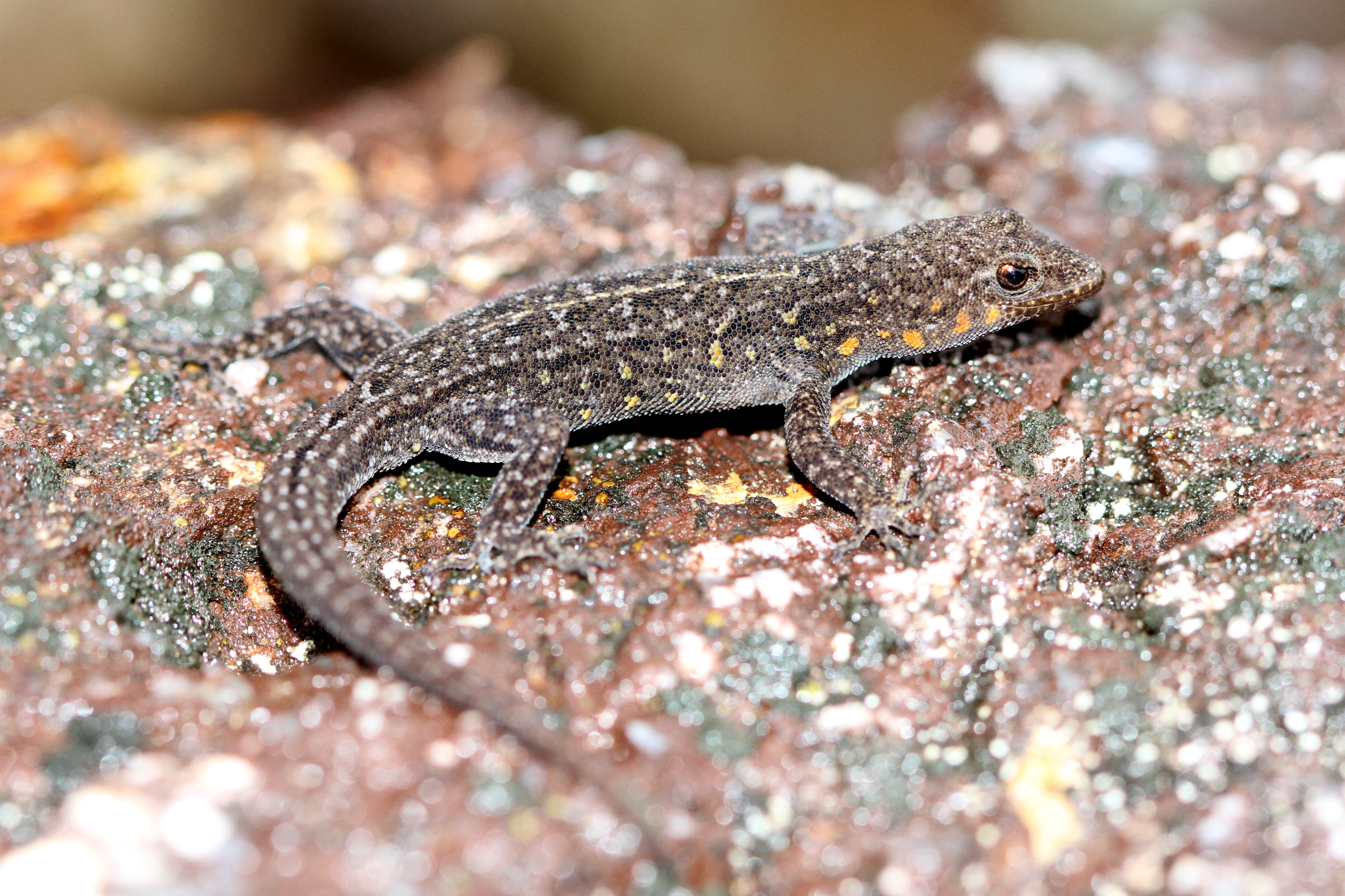

Conservation status
- Vulnerable (IUCN 3.1)

Scientific classification
- Kingdom: Animalia
- Phylum: Chordata
- Class: Reptilia
- Order: Squamata
- Suborder: Gekkota
- Family: Gekkonidae
- Genus: Cnemaspis
- Species: C. indica

Binomial name
- Cnemaspis indica (Gray, 1846)

= Indian day gecko =

Species of reptile found in India

The Indian day gecko or Nilgiri dwarf gecko (Cnemaspis indica) is a species of diurnal and insectivorous, rock-dwelling gecko found in the high elevation (> 1800 m asl) grasslands and montane forests of the Western Ghats ranges in South India, such as the Nilgiri Hills (including Ooty and Mukurthi National Park) and the Silent Valley National Park) in Tamil Nadu and Kerala states, respectively.
