= Sororoditha =

Scientific classification
- Kingdom: Animalia
- Phylum: Arthropoda
- Subphylum: Chelicerata
- Class: Arachnida
- Order: Pseudoscorpiones
- Family: Chthoniidae
- Subfamily: Verrucadithinae
- Genus: Sororoditha; J. C. Chamberlin and R. V. Chamberlin, 1945

Genus of pseudoscorpions

Sororoditha is a genus of pseudoscorpions in the family Chthoniidae. There is at least one described species in Sororoditha, S. hirsuta.
