= Staurogyne hirsuta =

Scientific classification
- Kingdom: Plantae
- Clade: Tracheophytes
- Clade: Angiosperms
- Clade: Eudicots
- Clade: Asterids
- Order: Lamiales
- Family: Acanthaceae
- Genus: Staurogyne
- Species: S. hirsuta

Binomial name
- Staurogyne hirsuta (Nees) Kuntze (1891)

Synonyms
- Ebermaiera hirsuta Nees (1847); Staurogyne glutinosa Lindau (1897), nom. illeg.

Species of flowering plant

Staurogyne hirsuta is a species of plant native to Brazilian cerrado vegetation. It is a subshrub endemic to Minas Gerais state in southeastern Brazil. This plant is cited in Flora Brasiliensis by Carl Friedrich Philipp von Martius.
