= Compsaditha =

Scientific classification
- Kingdom: Animalia
- Phylum: Arthropoda
- Subphylum: Chelicerata
- Class: Arachnida
- Order: Pseudoscorpiones
- Family: Chthoniidae
- Subfamily: Tridenchthoniinae
- Genus: Compsaditha; J. C. Chamberlin, 1929

Genus of pseudoscorpions

Compsaditha is a genus of pseudoscorpions in the family Chthoniidae. There are about 12 described species in Compsaditha.

== Species ==
These 12 species belong to the genus Compsaditha:

- Compsaditha aburi Chamberlin and R.V. Chamberlin, 1945
- Compsaditha angustula Beier, 1972
- Compsaditha basilewskyi Beier, 1962
- Compsaditha camponota Sivaraman, 1980
- Compsaditha congica Beier, 1959
- Compsaditha elegantula Beier, 1972
- Compsaditha fiebrigi (Beier, 1931)
- Compsaditha gressitti Beier, 1957
- Compsaditha indica Murthy, 1960
- Compsaditha parva Beier, 1951
- Compsaditha pygmaea Chamberlin, 1929
- Compsaditha seychellensis Beier, 1974
