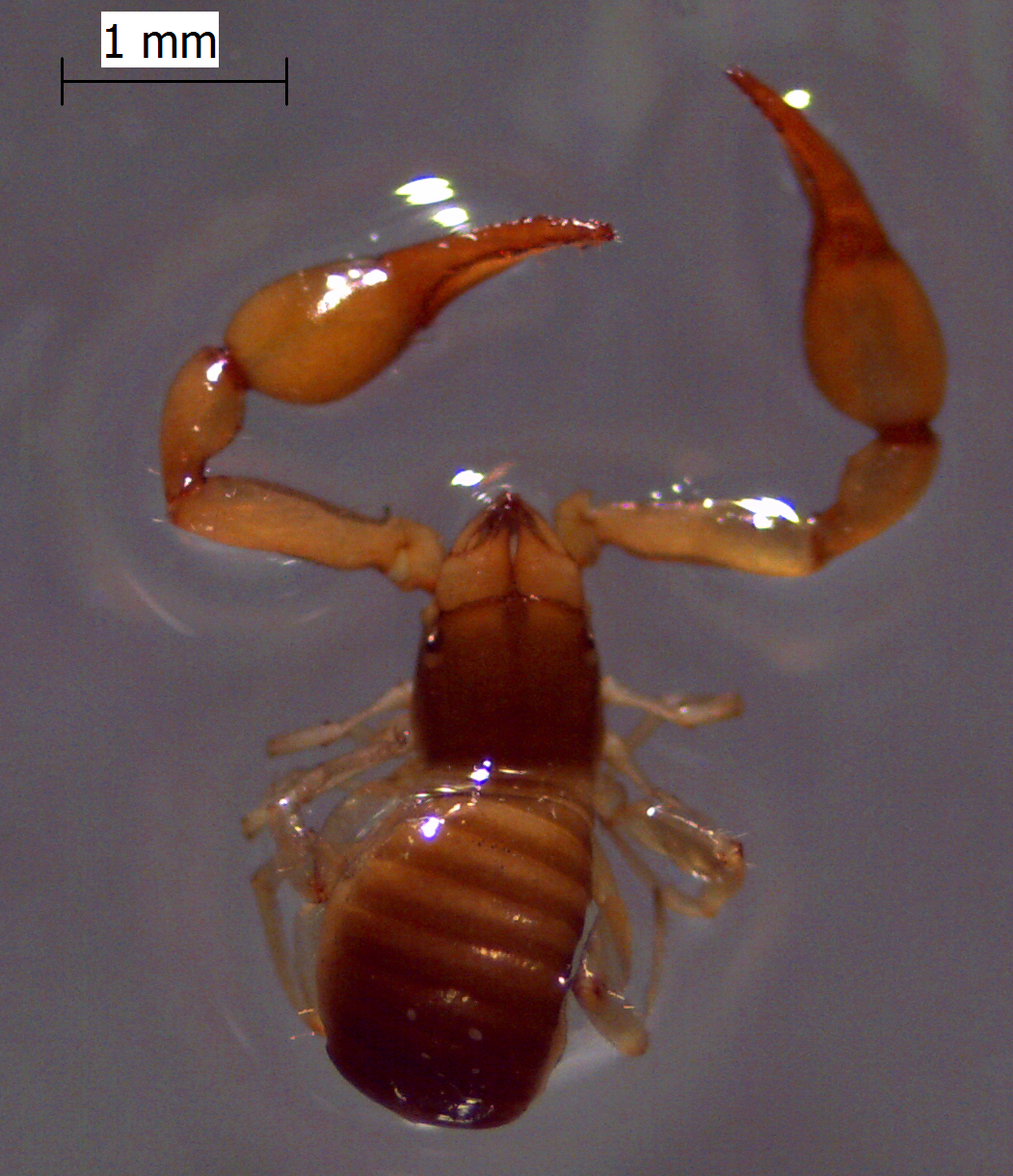
- Chthonius sp.

Scientific classification
- Domain: Eukaryota
- Kingdom: Animalia
- Phylum: Arthropoda
- Subphylum: Chelicerata
- Class: Arachnida
- Order: Pseudoscorpiones
- Superfamily: Chthonioidea
- Family: Chthoniidae; Daday, 1888

Genera
- See text

Diversity
- c. 30 genera, > 600 species

Synonyms
- Chthonidae

= Chthoniidae =

Chthoniidae Temporal range: Cretaceous–present

Family of pseudoscorpions

Chthoniidae is a family of pseudoscorpions within the superfamily Chthonioidea. The family contains more than 600 species in about 30 genera. Fossil species are known from Baltic, Dominican, and Burmese amber. Chthoniidae now includes the former families Tridenchthoniidae, and Lechytiidae which has been demoted to subfamilies.

== Genera ==
For a list of all currently described species see List of Chthoniidae species.

- Aphrastochthonius J. C. Chamberlin, 1962 — Mexico, southern US, Guatemala, Cuba
- Apochthonius J. C. Chamberlin, 1929 — North America
- Austrochthonius J. C. Chamberlin, 1929 — South America, Australia, New Zealand
- Caribchthonius Muchmore, 1976 — Caribbean
- Chiliochthonius Vitali-di Castri, 1975 — Chile
- Chthonius C. L. Koch, 1843 — Europe to Iran, North Africa, Balearic Islands, USA; one cosmopolitan species
- Congochthonius Beier, 1959 — Zaire
- Drepanochthonius Beier, 1964 — Chile
- Ephippiochthonius Beier, 1930
- Francochthonius Vitali-di Castri, 1975 — Chile
- Kleptochthonius J. C. Chamberlin, 1949 — USA
- Lagynochthonius Beier, 1951 — Australasia, Africa
- Malcolmochthonius Benedict, 1978 — USA
- Maorichthonius J. C. Chamberlin, 1925 — New Zealand
- Mexichthonius Muchmore, 1975 — Mexico, Texas
- Mundochthonius J. C. Chamberlin, 1929 — Eurasia, Dominican Republic, North America
- Neochthonius J. C. Chamberlin, 1929 — California, Romania (?)
- Paraliochthonius Beier, 1956 — Europe, Africa, Australia, Florida, several islands
- Pseudochthonius Balzan, 1892 — South, Central America, Africa
- Sathrochthoniella Beier, 1967 — New Zealand
- Sathrochthonius J. C. Chamberlin, 1962 — Australia to New Caledonia, South America
- Spelyngochthonius Beier, 1955 — Sardinia, Spain, France
- Stygiochthonius Carabajal Marquez, Garcia Carrillo & Rodriguez Fernandez, 2001 — Spain
- Troglochthonius Beier, 1939 — Italy, Yugoslavia
- Tyrannochthoniella Beier, 1966 — New Zealand
- Tyrannochthonius J. C. Chamberlin, 1929 — Brazil to southern USA, Australasia, Africa, Hawaii
- Vulcanochthonius Muchmore, 2000 — Hawai'i
- †Weygoldtiella Harvey et al., 2018 — Burmese amber, Myanmar Cenomanian
- †Prionochthonius — Burmese amber, Myanmar Cenomanian

=== Tridenchthoniinae ===
- Anaulacodithella — Southern Africa, Australia, New Caledonia
- † Chelignathus
- Compsaditha — Africa, South America, South and Southeast Asia, Seychelles
- Cryptoditha — South America
- Ditha — Africa, Southeast Asia, Oceania
- Dithella — Southeast Asia
- Haploditha — South America
- Heterolophus — Australia, South America
- Neoditha — South America
- Pycnodithella — Africa, Australia
- Sororoditha — South America
- Tridenchthonius — Africa, South and Central America
- Typhloditha — Africa
- Verrucaditha — North America
- Verrucadithella — Africa, South America

=== Lechytiinae ===
- Lechytia Balzan, 1892 Worldwide
