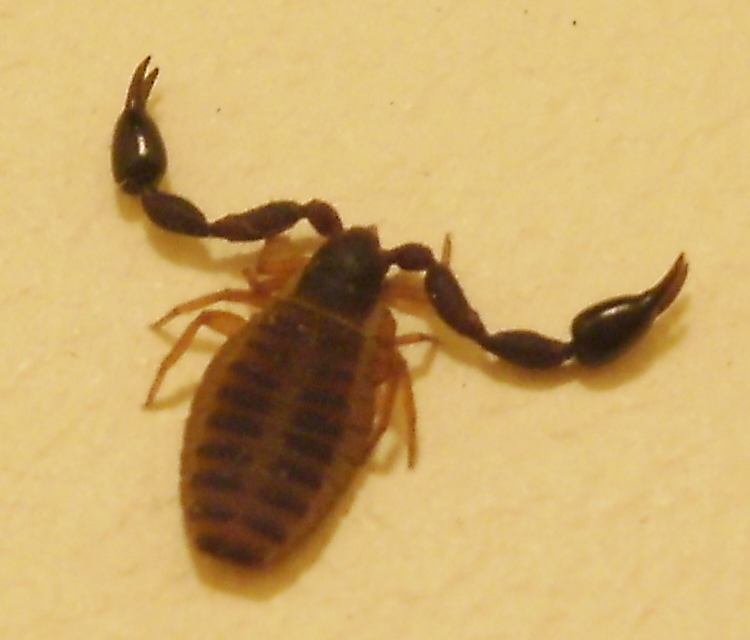
- Apatochernes sp.

Scientific classification
- Domain: Eukaryota
- Kingdom: Animalia
- Phylum: Arthropoda
- Subphylum: Chelicerata
- Class: Arachnida
- Order: Pseudoscorpiones
- Family: Chernetidae
- Subfamily: Chernetinae; Menge, 1855

Genera
- See text

= Chernetinae =

Subfamily of pseudoscorpions

Chernetinae is a subfamily of pseudoscorpions in the family Chernetidae.

== Genera ==
- Acanthicochernes - Acuminochernes - Adelphochernes - Americhernes - Anaperochernes - Antillochernes - Apatochernes - Asterochernes - Atherochernes - Austrochernes - Barbaraella - Bituberochernes - Byrsochernes - Cacoxylus - Caffrowithius - Calidiochernes - Caribochernes - Ceratochernes - Ceriochernes - Chelanops - Chelodamus - Chernes - Chiridiochernes - Chrysochernes - Cocinachernes - Coprochernes - Cordylochernes - Corosoma - Cyclochernes - Dasychernes - Dendrochernes - Dinocheirus - Dinochernes - Diplothrixochernes - Epactiochernes - Epichernes - Eumecochernes - Gelachernes - Gigantochernes - Gomphochernes - Haplochernes - Hebridochernes - Hesperochernes - Heterochernes - Hexachernes - Illinichernes - Incachernes - Indochernes - Interchernes - Lustrochernes - Macrochernes - Maorichernes - Marachernes - Maxchernes - Meiochernes - Mesochernes - Metagoniochernes - Mexachernes - Mirochernes - Mucrochernes - Myrmochernes - Neoallochernes - Neochelanops - Neochernes - Nesidiochernes - Nesiotochernes - Nesochernes - Ochrochernes - Odontochernes - Opsochernes - Orochernes - Pachychernes - Paracanthicochernes - Parachernes - Parapilanus - Paraustrochernes - Parazaona - Petterchernes - Phaulochernes - Phymatochernes - Pilanus - Pseudopilanus - Reischekia - Rhinochernes - Rhopalochernes - Satrapanus - Semeiochernes - Smeringochernes - Spelaeochernes - Sphenochernes - Sundochernes - Sundowithius - Systellochernes - Teratochernes - Thalassochernes - Thapsinochernes - Troglochernes - Tuberochernes - Tychochernes - Verrucachernes - Wyochernes - Xenochernes - Zaona
