= Parachernes sabulosus =

Scientific classification
- Domain: Eukaryota
- Kingdom: Animalia
- Phylum: Arthropoda
- Subphylum: Chelicerata
- Class: Arachnida
- Order: Pseudoscorpiones
- Family: Chernetidae
- Genus: Parachernes
- Species: P. sabulosus

Binomial name
- Parachernes sabulosus (Tullgren, 1909)

Species of pseudoscorpion

Holotype site: Brown Station, Dirk Hartog Island, WA'"`UNIQ--ref-00000007-QINU`"'

Parachernes sabulosus is a species of pseudoscorpion in the subgenus, Parachernes, of the subfamily Chernetinae, and was first described as Chelifer sabulosus by Albert Tullgren in 1909 from a specimen collected on Dirk Hartog Island.
