= Marachernes simulans =

Scientific classification
- Kingdom: Animalia
- Phylum: Arthropoda
- Subphylum: Chelicerata
- Class: Arachnida
- Order: Pseudoscorpiones
- Family: Chernetidae
- Genus: Marachernes
- Species: M. simulans

Binomial name
- Marachernes simulans Harvey, 1992

Species of pseudoscorpion

Marachernes simulans is a species of pseudoscorpion in the Chernetidae family. It is endemic to Australia. It was described in 1992 by Australian arachnologist Mark Harvey. The specific epithet simulans comes from the Latin simulo ('imitate' or 'copy') with reference to the similarity between this species and Marachernes perup.

== Description ==
The body length of the male holotype is 2.88 mm; that of the female paratype is 2.80 mm. The colour is mainly yellow-brown, with the carapace and pedipalps dark red-brown.

== Distribution and habitat ==
The species occurs in Victoria. The type locality is Upper Beaconsfield, some 45 km south-east of the centre of Melbourne, where the pseudoscorpions were collected from beneath tree bark.

== Behaviour ==
The pseudoscorpions are terrestrial predators.
