= Chrysochernes elegans =

Scientific classification
- Domain: Eukaryota
- Kingdom: Animalia
- Phylum: Arthropoda
- Subphylum: Chelicerata
- Class: Arachnida
- Order: Pseudoscorpiones
- Family: Chernetidae
- Genus: Chrysochernes
- Species: C. elegans

Binomial name
- Chrysochernes elegans Hoff, 1956

Species of pseudoscorpion

Chrysochernes elegans is a species of pseudoscorpion in the subfamily Chernetinae. It is found in New Mexico, United States.
