= Austrochernes cruciatus =

Scientific classification
- Domain: Eukaryota
- Kingdom: Animalia
- Phylum: Arthropoda
- Subphylum: Chelicerata
- Class: Arachnida
- Order: Pseudoscorpiones
- Family: Chernetidae
- Genus: Austrochernes
- Species: A. cruciatus

Binomial name
- Austrochernes cruciatus (Volschenk, 2007)

Synonyms
- Troglochernes cruciatus Volschenk, 2007

Species of pseudoscorpion

Holotype site: Fanning River Station, QLD'"`UNIQ--ref-00000007-QINU`"'

Austrochernes cruciatus is a species of pseudoscorpion in the subfamily Chernetinae. It was first described as Troglochernes cruciatus in 2007 by Erich Volschenk.
