= Austrochernes omorgus =

Scientific classification
- Kingdom: Animalia
- Phylum: Arthropoda
- Subphylum: Chelicerata
- Class: Arachnida
- Order: Pseudoscorpiones
- Family: Chernetidae
- Genus: Austrochernes
- Species: A. omorgus

Binomial name
- Austrochernes omorgus (Harvey & Volschenk, 2007)

Synonyms
- Troglochernes omorgus Harvey & Volschenk, 2007

Species of pseudoscorpion

Austrochernes omorgus is a species of pseudoscorpion in the Chernetidae family. It is endemic to Australia. It was described in 2007 by arachnologists Mark Harvey and Erich Volschenk. The specific epithet omorgus refers to the beetle with which the holotype was associated.

== Description ==
The body length of the female holotype is 3.74 mm. The colour of the pedipalps and carapace is dark red-brown, the abdomen and legs light red-brown. Eyes are absent.

== Distribution and habitat ==
The species occurs in the Carnarvon National Park in the southern Brigalow Belt bioregion of Queensland. The type locality is the Mount Moffat ranger’s house, where the holotype was found on a beetle (Omorgus costatus) at a light.

== Behaviour ==
The pseudoscorpions are terrestrial predators.
