= Americhernes paluma =

Scientific classification
- Kingdom: Animalia
- Phylum: Arthropoda
- Subphylum: Chelicerata
- Class: Arachnida
- Order: Pseudoscorpiones
- Family: Chernetidae
- Genus: Americhernes
- Species: A. paluma

Binomial name
- Americhernes paluma Harvey, 1990

Species of pseudoscorpion

Americhernes paluma is a species of pseudoscorpion in the Chernetidae family. It is endemic to Australia. It was described in 1990 by Australian arachnologist Mark Harvey. The specific epithet paluma refers to the type locality.

== Description ==
The body length of the female holotype is 2.5 mm. The colour is yellowish-brown, with the carapace and pedipalps slightly darker.

== Distribution and habitat ==
The species occurs in North Queensland. The type locality is Black Friar's Parish, Paluma. The holotype was found in plant litter.

== Behaviour ==
The pseudoscorpions are terrestrial predators.
