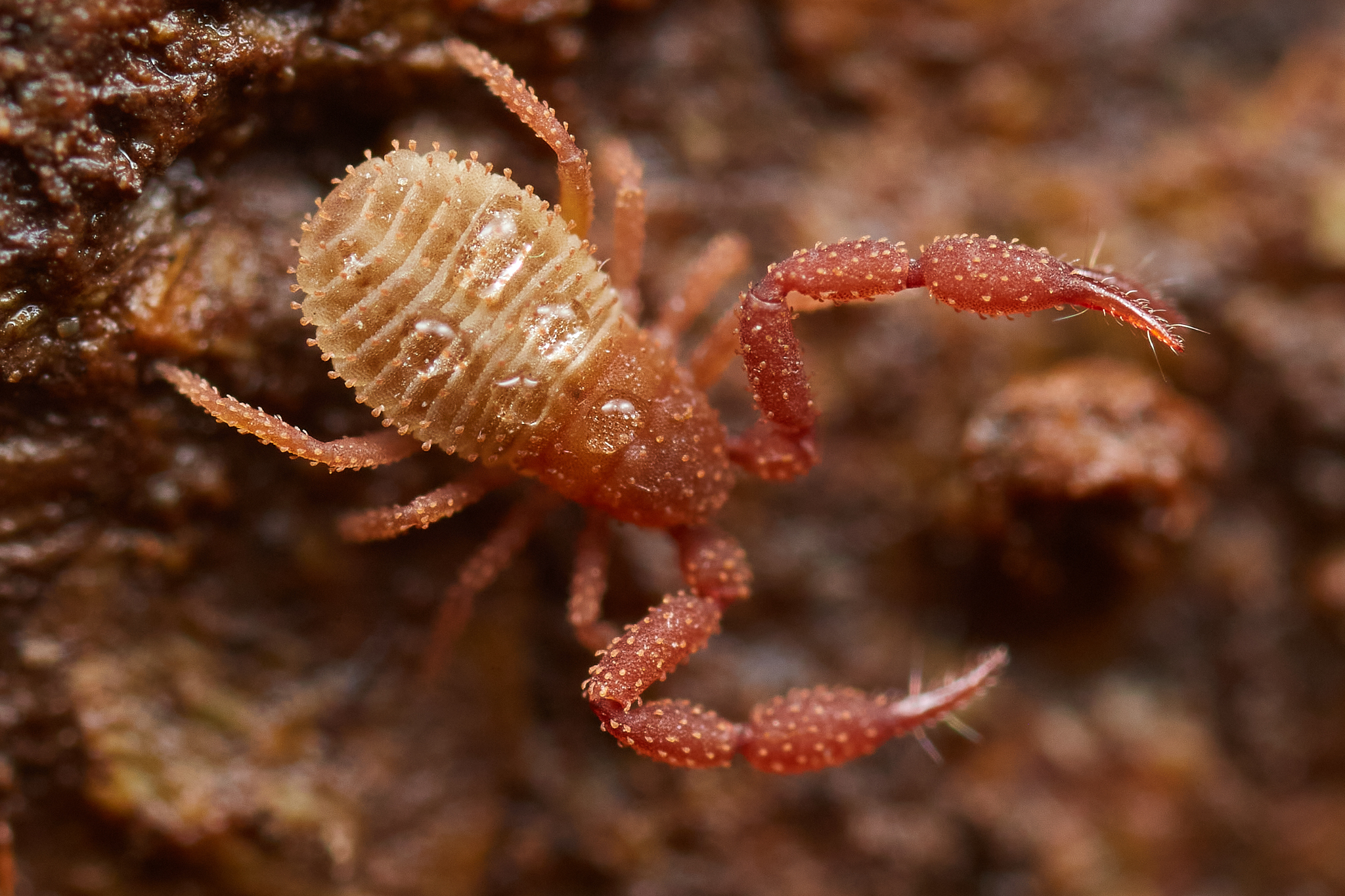
- Dinocheirus dorsalis

Scientific classification
- Kingdom: Animalia
- Phylum: Arthropoda
- Subphylum: Chelicerata
- Class: Arachnida
- Order: Pseudoscorpiones
- Family: Chernetidae
- Subfamily: Chernetinae
- Genus: Dinocheirus; J. C. Chamberlin, 1929

= Dinocheirus =

Genus of pseudoscorpions

Dinocheirus is a genus of pseudoscorpions in the family Chernetidae.

Species include:

- Dinocheirus aequalis (Banks, 1908)
- Dinocheirus altimanus (Ellingsen, 1910)
- Dinocheirus arizonensis (Banks, 1901)
- Dinocheirus astutus Hoff, 1956
- Dinocheirus athleticus Hoff, 1956
- Dinocheirus bulbipalpis (Redikorzev, 1949)
- Dinocheirus cavicola Muchmore, 1992
- Dinocheirus chilensis Beier, 1964
- Dinocheirus diabolicus Beier, 1964
- Dinocheirus dorsalis (Banks, 1895)
- Dinocheirus horricus Nelson and Manley, 1972
- Dinocheirus imperiosus Hoff, 1956
- Dinocheirus obesus (Banks, 1909)
- Dinocheirus pallidus (Banks, 1890)
- Dinocheirus panzeri (C. L. Koch, 1837)
- Dinocheirus partitus (Banks, 1909)
- Dinocheirus proximus Hoff, 1946
- Dinocheirus serratus (Moles, 1914)
- Dinocheirus solus Hoff, 1949
- Dinocheirus subrudis (Balzan, 1892)
- Dinocheirus tenoch Chamberlin, 1929
- Dinocheirus texanus Hoff and Clawson, 1952
- Dinocheirus topali Beier, 1964
- Dinocheirus transcaspius (Redikorzev, 1922)
- Dinocheirus uruguayanus Beier, 1970
- Dinocheirus validus (Banks, 1895)
- Dinocheirus venustus Hoff and Clawson, 1952
