= Austrochernes australiensis =

Scientific classification
- Kingdom: Animalia
- Phylum: Arthropoda
- Subphylum: Chelicerata
- Class: Arachnida
- Order: Pseudoscorpiones
- Family: Chernetidae
- Genus: Austrochernes
- Species: A. australiensis

Binomial name
- Austrochernes australiensis (With, 1905)

Synonyms
- Chelifer australiensis With, 1905

Species of pseudoscorpion

Austrochernes australiensis is a species of pseudoscorpion in the Chernetidae family. It is endemic to Australia. It was described in 1905 by Danish arachnologist Carl Johannes With.

== Distribution and habitat ==
The species occurs in Queensland, which is also given as the type locality.

== Behaviour ==
The pseudoscorpions are terrestrial predators.
