= Illinichernes distinctus =

Scientific classification
- Domain: Eukaryota
- Kingdom: Animalia
- Phylum: Arthropoda
- Subphylum: Chelicerata
- Class: Arachnida
- Order: Pseudoscorpiones
- Family: Chernetidae
- Genus: Illinichernes
- Species: I. distinctus

Binomial name
- Illinichernes distinctus Hoff, 1949

Species of pseudoscorpion

Illinichernes distinctus is a species of pseudoscorpion in the family Chernetidae.
