= Megachernes penicillatus =

Scientific classification
- Kingdom: Animalia
- Phylum: Arthropoda
- Subphylum: Chelicerata
- Class: Arachnida
- Order: Pseudoscorpiones
- Family: Chernetidae
- Genus: Megachernes
- Species: M. penicillatus

Binomial name
- Megachernes penicillatus Beier, 1948

Species of pseudoscorpion

Megachernes penicillatus is a species of pseudoscorpion in the Chernetidae family. It was described in 1948 by Austrian arachnologist Max Beier.

== Distribution and habitat ==
The species occurs in Far North Queensland. The type locality is Dinner Creek, Ravenshoe, on the Atherton Tableland.

== Behaviour ==
The pseudoscorpions are terrestrial predators.
