= Americhernes neboissi =

Scientific classification
- Kingdom: Animalia
- Phylum: Arthropoda
- Subphylum: Chelicerata
- Class: Arachnida
- Order: Pseudoscorpiones
- Family: Chernetidae
- Genus: Americhernes
- Species: A. neboissi

Binomial name
- Americhernes neboissi Harvey, 1990

Species of pseudoscorpion

Americhernes neboissi is a species of pseudoscorpion in the Chernetidae family. It is endemic to Australia. It was described in 1990 by Australian arachnologist Mark Harvey. The specific epithet neboissi honours Latvian-Australian entomologist Arturs Neboiss (1924–2010) who collected the holotype.

== Description ==
The body length of the male holotype is 1.6 mm. The colour is yellowish-brown, with the carapace and pedipalps slightly darker.

== Distribution and habitat ==
The species occurs in Victoria. The type locality is the west branch of the King River, 10 km north-east of Tolmie, in the foothills of the Victorian Alps. The holotype was found attached to the leg of a Cheumatopsychid caddisfly.

== Behaviour ==
The pseudoscorpions are terrestrial predators.
