= Austrochernes imitans =

Scientific classification
- Kingdom: Animalia
- Phylum: Arthropoda
- Subphylum: Chelicerata
- Class: Arachnida
- Order: Pseudoscorpiones
- Family: Chernetidae
- Genus: Austrochernes
- Species: A. imitans

Binomial name
- Austrochernes imitans (Beier, 1969)

Synonyms
- Troglochernes imitans (Beier, 1967)

Species of pseudoscorpion

Austrochernes imitans is a species of pseudoscorpion in the Chernetidae family. It is endemic to Australia. It was described in 1969 by Austrian arachnologist Max Beier.

== Description ==
The body length of males is 3.23–4.50 mm; that of females is 3.94–4.74 mm. The colour of the pedipalps and carapace is dark reddish-brown, legs red-brown, and abdomen pale yellow-brown. Eyes are absent.

== Distribution and habitat ==
The species occurs on the Nullarbor Plain and Hampton bioregions, in south-east Western Australia. The type locality is Dingo Cave, where pseudoscorpions were found on guano and decaying vegetation in the dark zone.

== Behaviour ==
The pseudoscorpions are cave-dwelling, terrestrial predators.
