= Austinochernes andrewaustini =

Scientific classification
- Kingdom: Animalia
- Phylum: Arthropoda
- Subphylum: Chelicerata
- Class: Arachnida
- Order: Pseudoscorpiones
- Family: Chernetidae
- Genus: Austinochernes
- Species: A. andrewaustini

Binomial name
- Austinochernes andrewaustini Harvey, 2021

Species of pseudoscorpion

Austinochernes andrewaustini is a species of pseudoscorpion in the Chernetidae family. It is endemic to Australia. It was described in 2021 by Australian arachnologist Mark Harvey. The specific epithet andrewaustini honours Professor Andy Austin.

== Description ==
The body length of the male holotype is 2.87 mm; that of female paratypes 2.66–2.82 mm. The colour of the pedipalps, coxae and carapace is deep red-brown, the legs yellow-brown.

== Distribution and habitat ==
The species occurs in south-eastern Australia. The type locality is the summit of Mount Barker in the Mount Lofty Ranges east of Adelaide, where the holotype was collected from beneath a rock, with ants. The species has also been recorded from Sherbrooke Forest in the Dandenong Ranges, 40 km east of Melbourne.

== Behaviour ==
The pseudoscorpions are terrestrial predators.
