= Sundochernes queenslandicus =

Scientific classification
- Kingdom: Animalia
- Phylum: Arthropoda
- Subphylum: Chelicerata
- Class: Arachnida
- Order: Pseudoscorpiones
- Family: Chernetidae
- Genus: Sundochernes
- Species: S. queenslandicus

Binomial name
- Sundochernes queenslandicus Beier, 1975

Species of pseudoscorpion

Sundochernes queenslandicus is a species of pseudoscorpion in the Chernetidae family. It is endemic to Australia. It was described in 1975 by Austrian arachnologist Max Beier.

== Distribution and habitat ==
The species occurs in south-east Queensland. The type locality is Marburg, where the holotype was found in plant litter.

== Behaviour ==
The pseudoscorpions are terrestrial predators.
