= Americhernes mahnerti =

Scientific classification
- Kingdom: Animalia
- Phylum: Arthropoda
- Subphylum: Chelicerata
- Class: Arachnida
- Order: Pseudoscorpiones
- Family: Chernetidae
- Genus: Americhernes
- Species: A. mahnerti

Binomial name
- Americhernes mahnerti Harvey, 1990

Species of pseudoscorpion

Americhernes mahnerti is a species of pseudoscorpion in the Chernetidae family. It is endemic to Australia. It was described in 1990 by Australian arachnologist Mark Harvey. The specific epithet mahnerti honours Austrian zoologist Volker Mahnert (1943–2018) for his work on pseudoscorpions.

== Description ==
The body length of the female holotype is 2.1 mm. The colour is yellowish-brown, with the carapace and pedipalps slightly darker.

== Distribution and habitat ==
The species occurs in Far North Queensland. The type locality is Mount Finnigan in the Ngalba Bulal National Park, 37 km (23 mi) south of Cooktown. The holotype was found in a pitfall trap in rainforest plant litter at an elevation of 1,050 m (3,440 ft).

== Behaviour ==
The pseudoscorpions are terrestrial predators.
