= Cordylochernes dingo =

Scientific classification
- Kingdom: Animalia
- Phylum: Arthropoda
- Subphylum: Chelicerata
- Class: Arachnida
- Order: Pseudoscorpiones
- Family: Chernetidae
- Genus: Cordylochernes
- Species: C. dingo

Binomial name
- Cordylochernes dingo Harvey, 1990

Species of pseudoscorpion

Cordylochernes dingo is a species of pseudoscorpion in the Chernetidae family. It is endemic to Australia. It was described in 1990 by Australian arachnologist Mark Harvey. The specific epithet dingo refers to the type locality.

== Description ==
Body lengths of males are 5.1–5.7 mm; that of a paratype female 5.5 mm. The colour is generally yellowish-brown, with the pedipalps and front of the carapace dark reddish-brown.

== Distribution and habitat ==
The species occurs in the Kimberley region of North West Australia. The type locality is Lone Dingo, 11 km south-west of Walsh Point, Admiralty Gulf. The holotype male was found beneath eucalypt bark.

== Behaviour ==
The pseudoscorpions are terrestrial predators.
