= Paraustrochernes victorianus =

Scientific classification
- Kingdom: Animalia
- Phylum: Arthropoda
- Subphylum: Chelicerata
- Class: Arachnida
- Order: Pseudoscorpiones
- Family: Chernetidae
- Genus: Paraustrochernes
- Species: P. victorianus

Binomial name
- Paraustrochernes victorianus Beier, 1966

Species of pseudoscorpion

Paraustrochernes victorianus is a species of pseudoscorpion in the Chernetidae family. It is endemic to Australia. It was described in 1966 by Austrian arachnologist Max Beier. The specific epithet victorianus refers to the type locality.

== Distribution and habitat ==
The species occurs in south-eastern Australia. The type locality is Boolarra, central Gippsland, Victoria.

== Behaviour ==
The pseudoscorpions are terrestrial predators.
