= Haplochernes ramosus =

Scientific classification
- Kingdom: Animalia
- Phylum: Arthropoda
- Subphylum: Chelicerata
- Class: Arachnida
- Order: Pseudoscorpiones
- Family: Chernetidae
- Genus: Haplochernes
- Species: H. ramosus

Binomial name
- Haplochernes ramosus (L.Koch & Keyserling, 1885)

Synonyms
- Chelifer ramosus L.Koch & Keyserling, 1885

Species of pseudoscorpion

Haplochernes ramosus is a species of pseudoscorpion in the Chernetidae family. It is endemic to Australia. It was described in 1885 by German arachnologists Ludwig Carl Christian Koch and Eugen von Keyserling.

== Distribution and habitat ==
The species occurs in central and eastern Australia. The type locality is Rockhampton in Queensland.

== Behaviour ==
The pseudoscorpions are terrestrial predators.
