= Austrochernes guanophilus =

Scientific classification
- Kingdom: Animalia
- Phylum: Arthropoda
- Subphylum: Chelicerata
- Class: Arachnida
- Order: Pseudoscorpiones
- Family: Chernetidae
- Genus: Austrochernes
- Species: A. guanophilus

Binomial name
- Austrochernes guanophilus (Beier, 1967)

Synonyms
- Sundochernes guanophilus (Beier, 1967); Troglochernes guanophilus (Beier, 1967)

Species of pseudoscorpion

Austrochernes guanophilus is a species of pseudoscorpion in the Chernetidae family. It is endemic to Australia. It was described in 1967 by Austrian arachnologist Max Beier.

== Description ==
The body length of the male holotype is 3.36 mm; that of the female paratype is 3.97 mm. The colour of the pedipalps and carapace is dark reddish-brown, the abdomen and legs deep red-brown. Eyes are absent.

== Distribution and habitat ==
The species occurs in the Wombeyan Caves, in the Southern Highlands of south-eastern New South Wales. The type locality is Fig Tree Cave, where the pseudoscorpions were found in guano.

== Behaviour ==
The pseudoscorpions are cave-dwelling, terrestrial predators.
