= Americhernes orestes =

Scientific classification
- Kingdom: Animalia
- Phylum: Arthropoda
- Subphylum: Chelicerata
- Class: Arachnida
- Order: Pseudoscorpiones
- Family: Chernetidae
- Genus: Americhernes
- Species: A. orestes

Binomial name
- Americhernes orestes Harvey, 1990

Species of pseudoscorpion

Americhernes orestes is a species of pseudoscorpion in the Chernetidae family. It is endemic to Australia. It was described in 1990 by Australian arachnologist Mark Harvey. The specific epithet orestes (Greek: 'mountaineer') refers to the species’ presence on one of Queensland's highest mountains.

== Description ==
The body length of the female holotype is 1.6 mm. The colour is yellowish-brown, with the carapace and pedipalps slightly darker.

== Distribution and habitat ==
The species occurs in Far North Queensland. The type locality is Thornton Peak, in the Daintree Rainforest, 126 km north of Cairns. The holotype was found in plant litter at an elevation of 1,000–1,300 m.

== Behaviour ==
The pseudoscorpions are terrestrial predators.
