= Nesidiochernes australicus =

Scientific classification
- Kingdom: Animalia
- Phylum: Arthropoda
- Subphylum: Chelicerata
- Class: Arachnida
- Order: Pseudoscorpiones
- Family: Chernetidae
- Genus: Nesidiochernes
- Species: N. australicus

Binomial name
- Nesidiochernes australicus Beier, 1966

Species of pseudoscorpion

Nesidiochernes australicus is a species of pseudoscorpion in the Chernetidae family. It is endemic to Australia. It was described in 1966 by Austrian arachnologist Max Beier. The specific epithet australicus refers to its native range.

== Distribution and habitat ==
The species occurs in New South Wales and South Australia. The type locality is 5 km east of Cobar, where the pseudoscorpions were found in plant litter in low open woodland.

== Behaviour ==
The pseudoscorpions are terrestrial predators.
