= Sundochernes australiensis =

Scientific classification
- Kingdom: Animalia
- Phylum: Arthropoda
- Subphylum: Chelicerata
- Class: Arachnida
- Order: Pseudoscorpiones
- Family: Chernetidae
- Genus: Sundochernes
- Species: S. australiensis

Binomial name
- Sundochernes australiensis Beier, 1954

Species of pseudoscorpion

Sundochernes australiensis is a species of pseudoscorpion in the Chernetidae family. It is endemic to Australia. It was described in 1954 by Austrian arachnologist Max Beier.

== Distribution and habitat ==
The species occurs in south-west Western Australia. The type locality is Denmark.

== Behaviour ==
The pseudoscorpions are terrestrial predators.
