= Austinochernes zigzag =

Scientific classification
- Kingdom: Animalia
- Phylum: Arthropoda
- Subphylum: Chelicerata
- Class: Arachnida
- Order: Pseudoscorpiones
- Family: Chernetidae
- Genus: Austinochernes
- Species: A. zigzag

Binomial name
- Austinochernes zigzag Harvey, 2021

Species of pseudoscorpion

Austinochernes zigzag is a species of pseudoscorpion in the Chernetidae family. It is endemic to Australia. It was described in 2021 by Australian arachnologist Mark Harvey. The specific epithet zigzag refers to the type locality.

== Description ==
The body length of males is 2.40–2.80 mm. The colour of the pedipalps, coxae and carapace is deep red-brown, the legs yellow-brown.

== Distribution and habitat ==
The species occurs in northern Tasmania. The type locality is the Zigzag Track at Cataract Gorge, Launceston, where the male holotype and paratypes were collected from beneath a rock.

== Behaviour ==
The pseudoscorpions are terrestrial predators.
