= Conicochernes brevispinosus =

Scientific classification
- Kingdom: Animalia
- Phylum: Arthropoda
- Subphylum: Chelicerata
- Class: Arachnida
- Order: Pseudoscorpiones
- Family: Chernetidae
- Genus: Conicochernes
- Species: C. brevispinosus

Binomial name
- Conicochernes brevispinosus (L.Koch & Keyserling, 1885)

Synonyms
- Chelifer brevispinosus L.Koch & Keyerling, 1885; Chelifer keyserlingi With, 1907; Chelifer (Lamprochernes) silvestrii Beier, 1930

Species of pseudoscorpion

Conicochernes brevispinosus is a species of pseudoscorpion in the Chernetidae family. It is endemic to Australia. It was described in 1885 by German arachnologists Ludwig Carl Christian Koch and Eugen von Keyserling.

== Distribution and habitat ==
The species occurs at various sites in eastern and south-eastern Australia. Type localities include Rockhampton and Peak Downs in Central Queensland, and Mount Lofty in South Australia, where pseudoscorpions were collected from beneath tree bark.

== Behaviour ==
The pseudoscorpions are terrestrial predators.
