= Apatochernes posticus =

Scientific classification
- Kingdom: Animalia
- Phylum: Arthropoda
- Subphylum: Chelicerata
- Class: Arachnida
- Order: Pseudoscorpiones
- Family: Chernetidae
- Genus: Apatochernes
- Species: A. posticus

Binomial name
- Apatochernes posticus Beier, 1976

Species of pseudoscorpion

Apatochernes posticus is a species of pseudoscorpion in the Chernetidae family. It is endemic to Australia. It was described in 1976 by Austrian arachnologist Max Beier.

== Description ==
The body length of the male holotype is 3.0 mm. The colour of the pedipalps and carapace is very dark chocolate-brown.

== Distribution and habitat ==
The species occurs only on Norfolk Island, an Australian territory in the south-west Pacific Ocean. The type locality is Mount Pitt, where the holotype was collected at an elevation of 300 m from a Meryta angustifolia tree.

== Behaviour ==
The pseudoscorpions are terrestrial predators.
