= Conicochernes incrassatus =

Scientific classification
- Kingdom: Animalia
- Phylum: Arthropoda
- Subphylum: Chelicerata
- Class: Arachnida
- Order: Pseudoscorpiones
- Family: Chernetidae
- Genus: Conicochernes
- Species: C. incrassatus

Binomial name
- Conicochernes incrassatus (Beier, 1933)

Synonyms
- Haplochernes incrassatus Beier, 1933

Species of pseudoscorpion

Conicochernes incrassatus is a species of pseudoscorpion in the Chernetidae family. It is endemic to Australia. It was described in 1933 by Austrian arachnologist Max Beier.

== Distribution and habitat ==
The species occurs in Victoria. The type locality is Upper Ferntree Gully, 32 km east of central Melbourne, where the holotype was collected from beneath tree bark.

== Behaviour ==
The pseudoscorpions are terrestrial predators.
