= Apatochernes turbotti =

Scientific classification
- Domain: Eukaryota
- Kingdom: Animalia
- Phylum: Arthropoda
- Subphylum: Chelicerata
- Class: Arachnida
- Order: Pseudoscorpiones
- Family: Chernetidae
- Genus: Apatochernes
- Species: A. turbotti

Binomial name
- Apatochernes turbotti Beier, 1969

Species of pseudoscorpion

Apatochernes turbotti is a species of pseudoscorpion in the family Chernetidae. The species was first described by Max Beier in 1969, and is endemic to New Zealand.

== Taxonomy ==
The species was identified by Beier in 1969, based on specimens collected from Moekawa / South West Island in the Manawatāwhi / Three Kings Islands by Evan Graham Turbott in 1951. The holotype was collected from leaf litter under Karaka and pukanui groves. Beier named the species after Turbott.

== Description ==
Beier's original text (the type description) reads as follows:

Uniformly reddish brown, meso- and metazona of carapace only a little paler. Integument extraordinarily densely and finely granulate, grainlets of abdominal tergites somewhat transverse. Pleural membrane longitudinally striate-granulate. Vestitural bristles mostly short and moderately clavate. Carapace 1.2 times in the male, but only a little longer than broad posteriorly in the female, with two distinct but not very deep transverse furrows, the subbasal one twice as far from the anterior furrow as from the posterior margin. Eye spots wanting. Abdominal tergites divided except the ultimate; half tergites of the two anterior segments each with 5, the following with 6 ( ♂ ) to 7 ( ♀ ) posterior border bristles, onwards from 4th segment also with 1 lateral border bristle; half tergites of 10th segment with 2 posterior border bristles, 1 median border, 1 lateral border, and 1 discal bristle; 11th tergite with 6 border bristles and 2 discal bristles altogether, the discal and lateral border bristles elongate and distinctly clavate; bristles of the posterior segments successively longer. Half sternites mostly with 8, those of 10th segment with 6 border bristles; ultimate sternite with 4 ( ♂ ) to 6 ( ♀ ) border bristles and 2 discal bristles, the lateral border bristles elongate and slightly clavate. Palm of chelicera with 5 bristles, SB only dentate. Galea of the male almost simple, of the female with several terminal branches. Pedipalps moderately slender, with the medial and dorsal bristles short and distinctly clavate, and with the lateral and ventral bristles somewhat longer and mostly dentate only; mediodistal bristles of the hand elongate. Trochanteral tubercles round. Femur only very abruptly pedicellate, broadest distally, 3.2 times, tibia 2.8 times, hand 1.5 times ( ♀ ) to 1.8 times ( ♂ ), chela with pedicel 2.8 times ( ♀ ) to 3.3 times ( ♂ ), without pedicel 2.6 to 3 times longer than broad. Fingers as long as hand with pedicel ( ♂ ) or ( ♀ ) a little longer, each with about 60 teeth; fixed finger laterally with 8, medially with 3, movable one laterally with 9, medially with 2, accessory teeth. Disposition of tactile setae regular. Hind tarsus without tactile bristle.

Beier measured the body length of male specimens as being 2 mm (0.079 in), and 2.6 mm (0.10 in) in females.

The species can be distinguished from other 5 cherical palm-bristle species by having uniformly reddish brown abdominal tergites.

== Distribution and habitat ==
The species is endemic to New Zealand, found in the Manawatāwhi / Three Kings Islands and in the Northland Region, as far south as the Bay of Islands.
