= Conicochernes doyleae =

Scientific classification
- Kingdom: Animalia
- Phylum: Arthropoda
- Subphylum: Chelicerata
- Class: Arachnida
- Order: Pseudoscorpiones
- Family: Chernetidae
- Genus: Conicochernes
- Species: C. doyleae

Binomial name
- Conicochernes doyleae Kennedy, 1989

Species of pseudoscorpion

Conicochernes doyleae is a species of pseudoscorpion in the Chernetidae family. It is endemic to Australia. It was described in 1989 by Australian arachnologist Clarice Kennedy. The specific epithet doyleae honours Suzanne Doyle, colleague and field assistant of the author.

== Description ==
The body length of males is 2.70–3.28 mm; that of females 2.92–3.46 mm. The colour is dark red-brown.

== Distribution and habitat ==
The species occurs in eastern New South Wales. The type locality is Stanley Street, Chatswood, Sydney, where pseudoscorpions were collected from beneath the bark of a brush box tree.

== Behaviour ==
The pseudoscorpions are terrestrial predators.
