= Americhernes muchmorei =

Scientific classification
- Kingdom: Animalia
- Phylum: Arthropoda
- Subphylum: Chelicerata
- Class: Arachnida
- Order: Pseudoscorpiones
- Family: Chernetidae
- Genus: Americhernes
- Species: A. muchmorei

Binomial name
- Americhernes muchmorei Harvey, 1990

Species of pseudoscorpion

Americhernes muchmorei is a species of pseudoscorpion in the Chernetidae family. It is endemic to Australia. It was described in 1990 by Australian arachnologist Mark Harvey. The specific epithet muchmorei honours American arachnologist William Muchmore (1920–2017) who described the genus Americhernes.

== Description ==
The body length of the male holotype is 2.7 mm. The colour is yellowish-brown, with the carapace and pedipalps slightly darker.

== Distribution and habitat ==
The species occurs in Far North Queensland. The type locality is 1.5 km west of Cape Tribulation. The holotype was found in rainforest plant litter at an elevation of 150 m.

== Behaviour ==
The pseudoscorpions are terrestrial predators.
