= Marachernes bellus =

Scientific classification
- Kingdom: Animalia
- Phylum: Arthropoda
- Subphylum: Chelicerata
- Class: Arachnida
- Order: Pseudoscorpiones
- Family: Chernetidae
- Genus: Marachernes
- Species: M. bellus

Binomial name
- Marachernes bellus Harvey, 1992

Species of pseudoscorpion

Marachernes bellus is a species of pseudoscorpion in the Chernetidae family. It is endemic to Australia. It was described in 1992 by Australian arachnologist Mark Harvey. The specific epithet bellus (Latin: 'pretty' or 'lovely') refers to the species’ beauty.

== Description ==
The body length of males is 2.74–3.14 mm; that of females 2.99–3.34 mm. The colour is mainly yellow-brown, with the carapace, pedipalps and legs dark red-brown.

== Distribution and habitat ==
The species occurs in south-western Victoria and in Tasmania. The type locality is Separation Creek in the Otway Ranges, where the pseudoscorpions were found beneath eucalypt bark in association with colonies of Iridomyrmex ants.

== Behaviour ==
The pseudoscorpions are terrestrial predators.
