= Haplochernes norfolkensis =

Scientific classification
- Kingdom: Animalia
- Phylum: Arthropoda
- Subphylum: Chelicerata
- Class: Arachnida
- Order: Pseudoscorpiones
- Family: Chernetidae
- Genus: Haplochernes
- Species: H. norfolkensis

Binomial name
- Haplochernes norfolkensis Beier, 1976

Species of pseudoscorpion

Haplochernes norfolkensis is a species of pseudoscorpion in the Chernetidae family. It is endemic to Australia. It was described in 1976 by Austrian arachnologist Max Beier. The specific epithet norfolkensis refers to its native range.

== Description ==
The body length is 2.5–3.5 mm. The colour is mainly very dark chocolate-brown, the carapace proximally lighter.

== Distribution and habitat ==
The species occurs only on Norfolk Island, an Australian territory in the south-west Pacific Ocean. The type locality is Steels Point, where the holotype was beaten from the foliage of a pyramid tree.

== Behaviour ==
The pseudoscorpions are terrestrial predators.
