= Austrochernes dewae =

Scientific classification
- Kingdom: Animalia
- Phylum: Arthropoda
- Subphylum: Chelicerata
- Class: Arachnida
- Order: Pseudoscorpiones
- Family: Chernetidae
- Genus: Austrochernes
- Species: A. dewae

Binomial name
- Austrochernes dewae (Beier, 1967)

Synonyms
- Sundochernes dewae Beier, 1967; Troglochernes dewae (Beier, 1967)

Species of pseudoscorpion

Austrochernes dewae is a species of pseudoscorpion in the Chernetidae family. It is endemic to Australia. It was described in 1967 by Austrian arachnologist Max Beier.

== Description ==
Body lengths of males are 2.34–2.81 mm; those of females 2.51–3.05 mm. The colour of the pedipalps and carapace is deep reddish-brown, the abdomen and legs light yellowish-brown.

== Distribution and habitat ==
The species has been recorded from various sites across Australia from the nests of hollow-nesting birds. The type locality is Brewarrina in northern New South Wales, where the holotype was found in a galah’s nest. The species has also been recorded from the nests of a sulphur-crested cockatoo in Far North Queensland, and in the nests of Carnaby's black cockatoos and a rufous treecreeper in south-west Western Australia.

== Behaviour ==
The pseudoscorpions are terrestrial predators.
