= Mesochernes elegans =

Scientific classification
- Domain: Eukaryota
- Kingdom: Animalia
- Phylum: Arthropoda
- Subphylum: Chelicerata
- Class: Arachnida
- Order: Pseudoscorpiones
- Family: Chernetidae
- Genus: Mesochernes
- Species: M. elegans

Binomial name
- Mesochernes elegans (Balzan, 1892)

Synonyms
- Chelifer (Lamprochernes) elegans Balzan, 1892; Chelifer elegans Balzan, 1892

Species of pseudoscorpion

Mesochernes elegans is a species of pseudoscorpions in the family Chernetidae. It is found in Venezuela.
