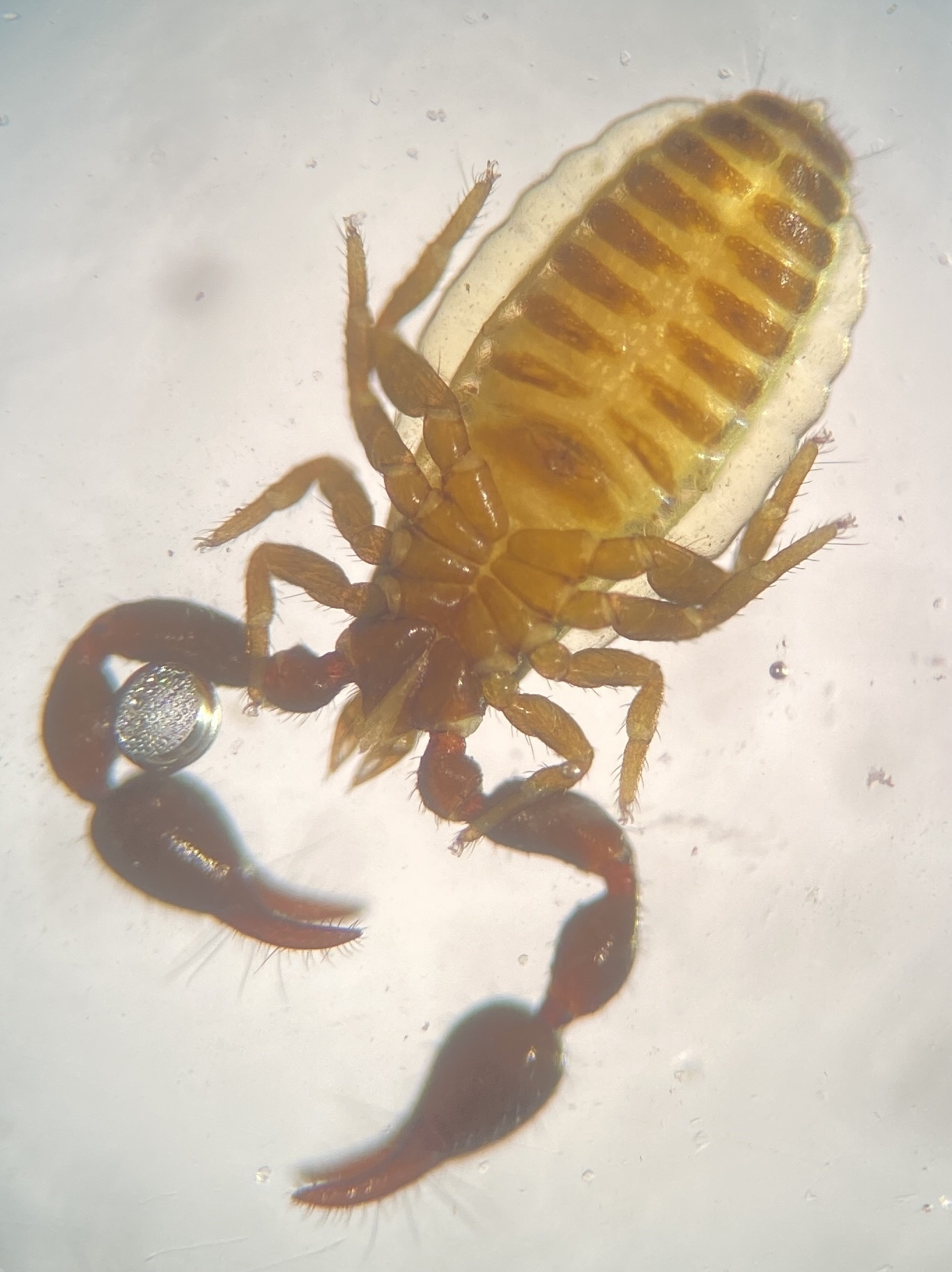

Scientific classification
- Kingdom: Animalia
- Phylum: Arthropoda
- Subphylum: Chelicerata
- Class: Arachnida
- Order: Pseudoscorpiones
- Family: Chernetidae
- Genus: Parachernes
- Species: P. virginicus

Binomial name
- Parachernes virginicus (Banks, 1895)

= Parachernes virginicus =

Species of pseudoscorpion

Parachernes virginicus is a species of pseudoscorpion of the family Chernetidae. Pseudoscorpions are small arachnids, resembling scorpions but lacking a tail and stinger, and are typically 2-8 mm in length. This species was first described by Nathan Banks in 1895 and is named after its discovery location in Virginia, USA.
