= Nesidiochernes slateri =

Scientific classification
- Kingdom: Animalia
- Phylum: Arthropoda
- Subphylum: Chelicerata
- Class: Arachnida
- Order: Pseudoscorpiones
- Family: Chernetidae
- Genus: Nesidiochernes
- Species: N. slateri

Binomial name
- Nesidiochernes slateri Beier, 1975

Species of pseudoscorpion

Nesidiochernes slateri is a species of pseudoscorpion in the Chernetidae family. It is endemic to Australia. It was described in 1975 by Austrian arachnologist Max Beier.

== Distribution and habitat ==
The species occurs in south-west Western Australia. The type locality is Peak Head, south of Albany.

== Behaviour ==
The pseudoscorpions are terrestrial predators.
