= Balgachernes =

Scientific classification
- Kingdom: Animalia
- Phylum: Arthropoda
- Subphylum: Chelicerata
- Class: Arachnida
- Order: Pseudoscorpiones
- Family: Chernetidae
- Genus: Balgachernes; Harvey, 2018

Type species
- Balgachernes occultus Harvey, 2018

Genus of pseudoscorpions

Balgachernes is a monotypic genus of pseudoscorpions in the Chernetidae family. It is endemic to Australia, and was described in 2018 by Australian arachnologist Mark Harvey. The name of the genus combines the common name 'balga' for the grasstree species Xanthorrhoea preissii, with which the pseudoscorpions are associated, with the genus name Chernes (Greek: 'labourer').

== Species ==
The genus contains the single species Balgachernes occultus Harvey, 2018. The specific epithet occultus (Latin: 'cover' or 'conceal') refers to the pseudoscorpions’ preference for living among balga leaves.

=== Description ===
The body length of males is 2.74–3.58 mm; that of females is 2.11–3.76 mm. The colour is mainly dark reddish-brown, with the legs yellowish-brown.

=== Distribution and habitat ===
The species occurs in south-west Western Australia where it has been recorded from the Swan Coastal Plain, Darling Scarp and Stirling Range National Park. The type locality is Ashendon Road, east of Pickering Brook, a suburb of Perth. The pseudoscorpions have only been found in balga (Xanthorrhoea preissii) grasstrees, with which they appear to have a specialised association.
