= Megachernes =

Scientific classification
- Kingdom: Animalia
- Phylum: Arthropoda
- Subphylum: Chelicerata
- Class: Arachnida
- Order: Pseudoscorpiones
- Family: Chernetidae
- Genus: Megachernes; Beier, 1932

Type species
- Chernes grandis Beier, 1930

Genus of pseudoscorpions

Megachernes is a genus of pseudoscorpions in the Chernetidae family. It was described in 1932 by Austrian arachnologist Max Beier.

== Species ==
The genus contains the following species:

- Megachernes barbatus Beier, 1951
- Megachernes biyunensis Xu, Gao and Zhang, 2022
- Megachernes crinitus Beier, 1948
- Megachernes glandulosus Mahnert, 2009
- Megachernes grandis (Beier, 1930)
- Megachernes himalayensis (Ellingsen, 1914)
- Megachernes kanneliyensis Harvey, Ratnaweera, Randeniya and Wijesinghe, 2012
- Megachernes limatus Hoff and Parrack, 1958
  - Megachernes limatus crassus Beier, 1965
  - Megachernes limatus limatus Hoff and Parrack, 1958
- Megachernes loebli Schawaller, 1991
- Megachernes mongolicus (Redikorzev, 1934)
- Megachernes monstrosus Beier, 1966
- Megachernes ochotonae Krumpál and Kiefer, 1982
- Megachernes papuanus Beier, 1948
- Megachernes pavlovskyi Redikorzev, 1949
- Megachernes penicillatus Beier, 1948
- Megachernes philippinus Beier, 1966
- Megachernes queenslandicus Beier, 1948
- Megachernes ryugadensis Morikawa, 1954
  - Megachernes ryugadensis myophilus Morikawa, 1960
  - Megachernes ryugadensis naikaiensis Morikawa, 1957
  - Megachernes ryugadensis ryugadensis Morikawa, 1954
- Megachernes soricicola Beier, 1974
- Megachernes titanius Beier, 1951
- Megachernes trautneri Schawaller, 1994
- Megachernes tuberosus Mahnert, 2009
- Megachernes vietnamensis Beier, 1967
