= Cordylochernes =

Scientific classification
- Kingdom: Animalia
- Phylum: Arthropoda
- Subphylum: Chelicerata
- Class: Arachnida
- Order: Pseudoscorpiones
- Family: Chernetidae
- Genus: Cordylochernes; Beier, 1932

Type species
- Chelifer macrodactylus Tömösváry, 1884

Genus of pseudoscorpions

Cordylochernes is a genus of pseudoscorpions in the Chernetidae family. It was described in 1932 by Austrian arachnologist Max Beier.

== Species ==
The genus contains the following species:

- Cordylochernes angustochelatus Hoff, 1944
- Cordylochernes costaricensis Beier, 1932
- Cordylochernes dingo Harvey, 1990
- Cordylochernes fallax Beier, 1933
- Cordylochernes nigermanus Hoff, 1944
- Cordylochernes octentoctus (Balzan, 1892)
- Cordylochernes panamensis Hoff, 1944
- Cordylochernes perproximus Beier, 1933
- Cordylochernes potens Hoff, 1947
- Cordylochernes scorpioides (Linnaeus, 1758)
