= Austinochernes =

Scientific classification
- Kingdom: Animalia
- Phylum: Arthropoda
- Subphylum: Chelicerata
- Class: Arachnida
- Order: Pseudoscorpiones
- Family: Chernetidae
- Genus: Austinochernes; Harvey, 2021

Type species
- Austinochernes andrewaustini Harvey, 2021

Genus of pseudoscorpions

Austinochernes is a genus of pseudoscorpions in the Chernetidae family. It is endemic to Australia, and was described in 2021 by Australian arachnologist Mark Harvey. The genus name honours Professor Andy Austin for his contributions to systematics, combined with the genus name Chernes (Greek: 'labourer').

== Species ==
The genus contains the following two species:

- Austinochernes andrewaustini Harvey, 2021
- Austinochernes zigzag Harvey, 2021
