= Calymmachernes =

Scientific classification
- Kingdom: Animalia
- Phylum: Arthropoda
- Subphylum: Chelicerata
- Class: Arachnida
- Order: Pseudoscorpiones
- Family: Chernetidae
- Genus: Calymmachernes; Beier, 1954

Type species
- Calymmachernes angulatus Beier, 1954

Genus of pseudoscorpions

Calymmachernes is a monotypic genus of pseudoscorpions in the Chernetidae family. It is endemic to Australia. It was described in 1954 by Austrian arachnologist Max Beier.

== Species ==
The genus contains the sole species Calymmachernes angulatus Beier,1954.

=== Distribution and habitat ===
The species occurs in south-west Western Australia. The type locality is Thompsons Road, Walpole, where the holotype was found under bark.

=== Behaviour ===
The pseudoscorpions are terrestrial predators.
