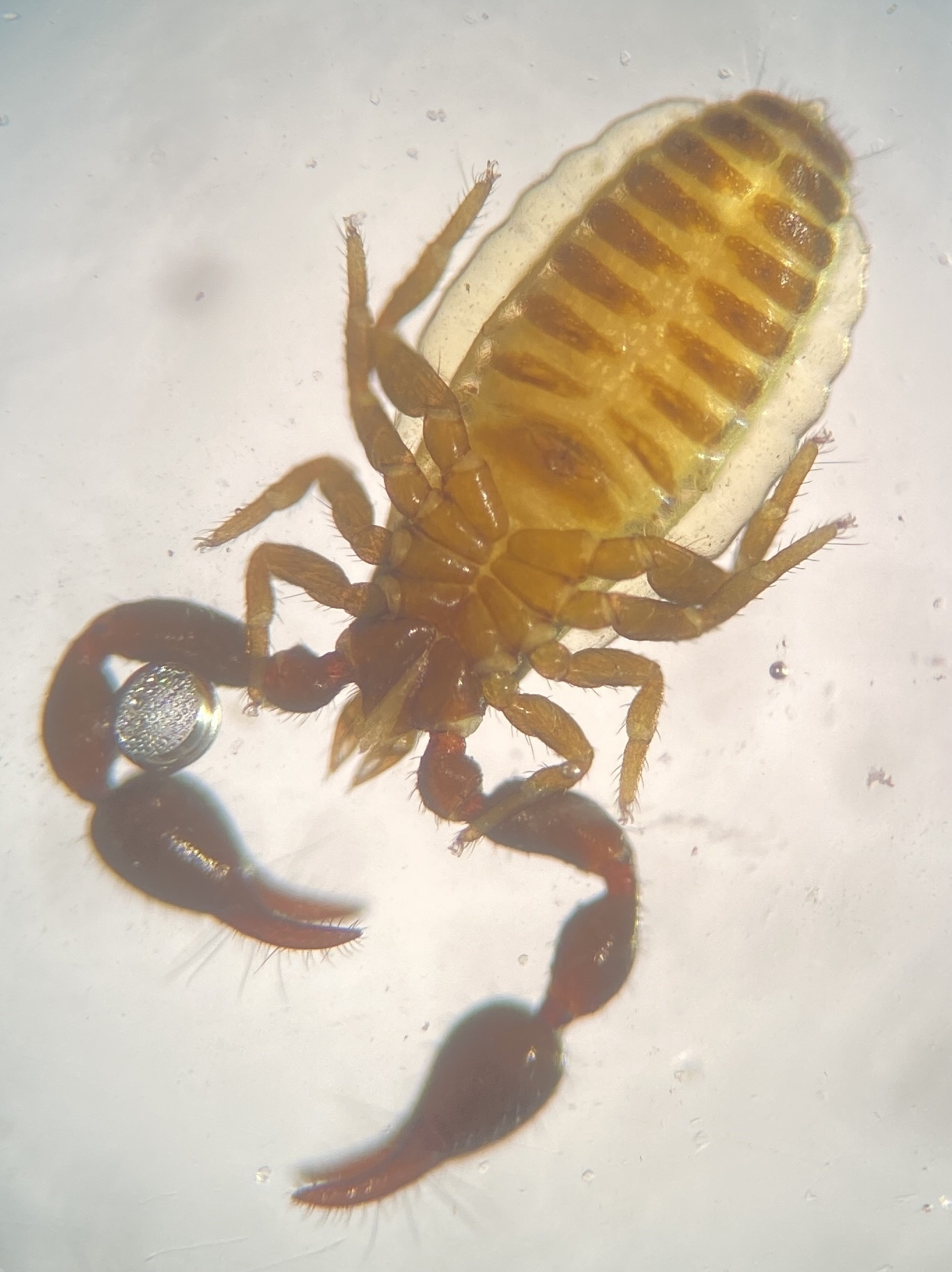
- Parachernes virginicus

Scientific classification
- Kingdom: Animalia
- Phylum: Arthropoda
- Subphylum: Chelicerata
- Class: Arachnida
- Order: Pseudoscorpiones
- Family: Chernetidae
- Subfamily: Chernetinae
- Genus: Parachernes; J.C.Chamberlin, 1931

= Parachernes =

Genus of pseudoscorpions

Parachernes is a genus of pseudoscorpions in the subfamily Chernetinae, first described by Joseph Conrad Chamberlin in 1931.

Species of this genus are found in the Americas, and also in Australia (Parachernes sabulosus).

== Species ==
The Encyclopedia of Life lists 64 species. Some of which are:

- Parachernes (Parachernes) argentatopunctatus (Ellingsen 1910)
- Parachernes (Parachernes) argentinus Beier 1967
- Parachernes (Parachernes) confraternus (Banks 1909)
- Parachernes (Parachernes) crassimanus (Balzan 1887)
- Parachernes (Parachernes) dissimilis Muchmore 1980
- Parachernes (Parachernes) fallax Beier 1959
- Parachernes (Parachernes) galapagensis Beier 1977
- Parachernes (Parachernes) sabulosus (Tullgren, 1909)
