= Mesochernes =

Scientific classification
- Domain: Eukaryota
- Kingdom: Animalia
- Phylum: Arthropoda
- Subphylum: Chelicerata
- Class: Arachnida
- Order: Pseudoscorpiones
- Family: Chernetidae
- Subfamily: Chernetinae
- Genus: Mesochernes; Beier, 1932

Species
- Mesochernes australis Mello-Leitão, 1939; Mesochernes costaricensis Beier, 1932; Mesochernes elegans (Balzan, 1892); Mesochernes gracilis Beier, 1932; Mesochernes venezuelanus (Balzan, 1892)

Genus of pseudoscorpions

Mesochernes is a genus of pseudoscorpions in the family Chernetidae.
