= Maxchernes =

Scientific classification
- Kingdom: Animalia
- Phylum: Arthropoda
- Subphylum: Chelicerata
- Class: Arachnida
- Order: Pseudoscorpiones
- Family: Chernetidae
- Subfamily: Chernetinae
- Genus: Maxchernes (Feio, 1960)

Species
- Maxchernes birabeni; Maxchernes iporangae; Maxchernes plaumanni

Genus of pseudoscorpions

Maxchernes is a genus of pseudoscorpions in the subfamily Chernetinae.
