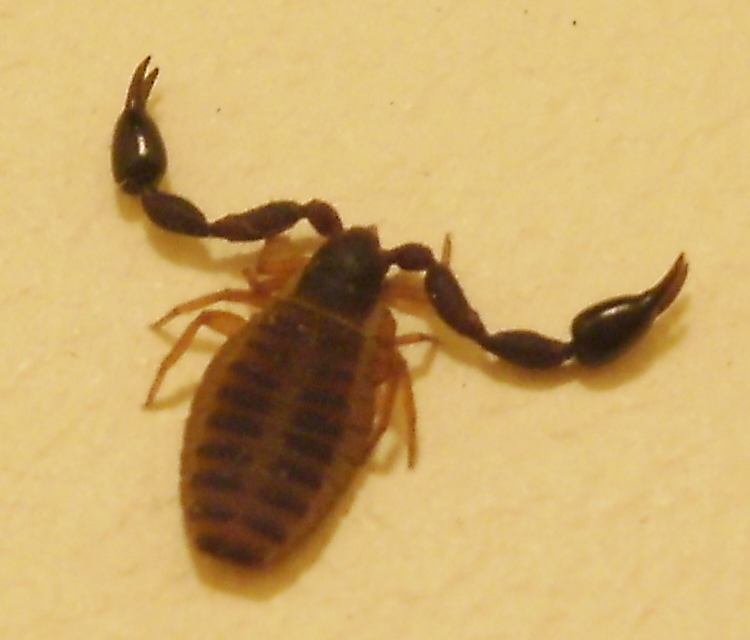
- Apatochernes sp.

Scientific classification
- Domain: Eukaryota
- Kingdom: Animalia
- Phylum: Arthropoda
- Subphylum: Chelicerata
- Class: Arachnida
- Order: Pseudoscorpiones
- Family: Chernetidae
- Subfamily: Chernetinae
- Genus: Apatochernes; Beier, 1948

Species
- See text

= Apatochernes =

Genus of pseudoscorpions

Apatochernes is a genus of pseudoscorpions in the subfamily Chernetinae.

== Species ==
- Apatochernes antarcticus Beier, 1964
- Apatochernes chathamensis Beier, 1976
- Apatochernes cheliferoides Beier, 1948
- Apatochernes cruciatus Beier, 1976
- Apatochernes curtulus Beier, 1948
- Apatochernes gallinaceus Beier, 1967
- Apatochernes insolitus Beier, 1976
- Apatochernes kuscheli Beier, 1976
- Apatochernes maoricus Beier, 1966
- Apatochernes nestoris Beier, 1962
- Apatochernes obrieni Beier, 1966
- Apatochernes posticus Beier, 1976
- Apatochernes proximus Beier, 1948
- Apatochernes solitarius Beier, 1976
- Apatochernes turbotti Beier, 1969
- Apatochernes vastus Beier, 1976
- Apatochernes wisei Beier, 1976
