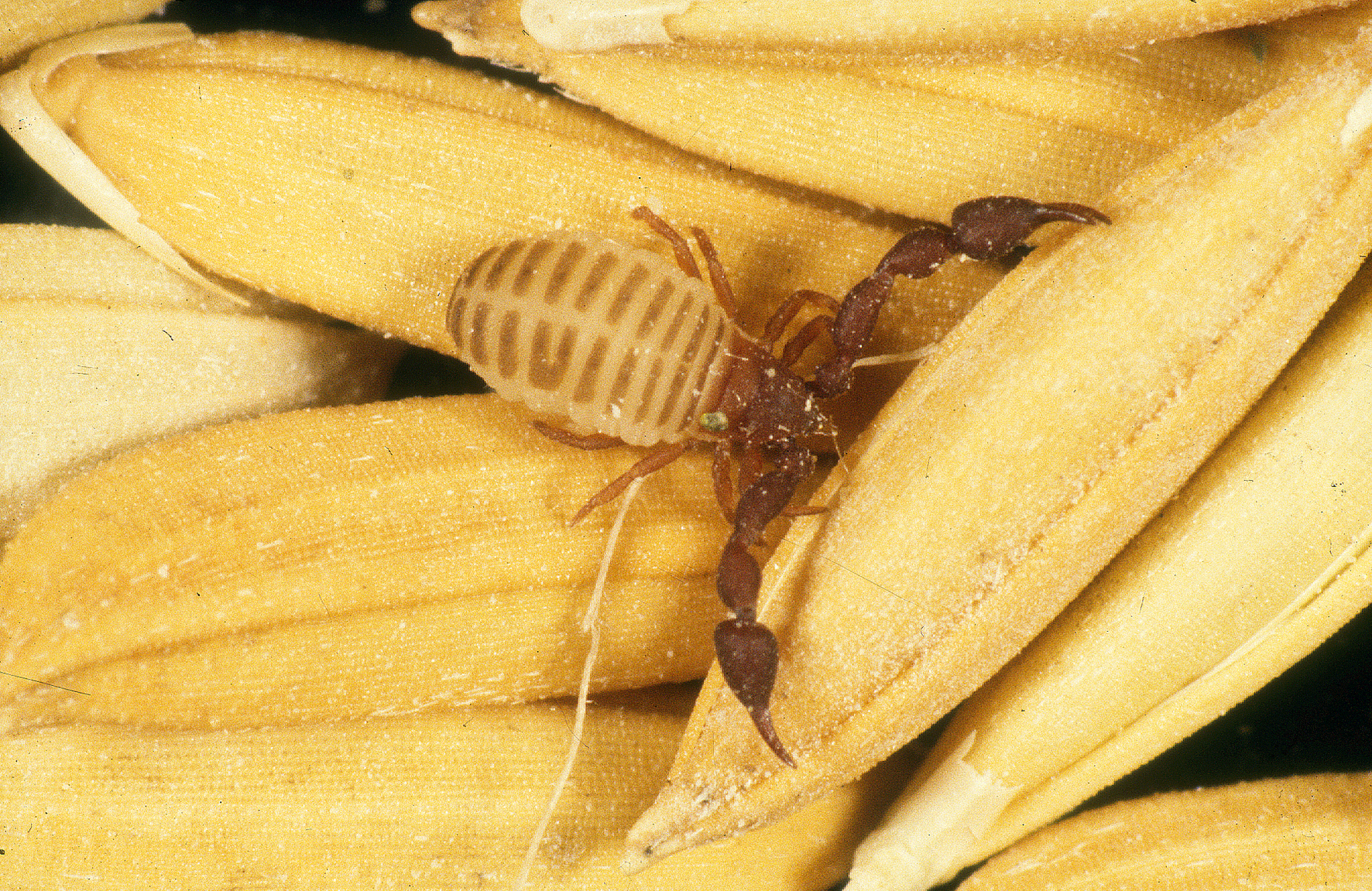
- Allochernes wideri

Scientific classification
- Domain: Eukaryota
- Kingdom: Animalia
- Phylum: Arthropoda
- Subphylum: Chelicerata
- Class: Arachnida
- Order: Pseudoscorpiones
- Family: Chernetidae
- Subfamily: Lamprochernetinae
- Genus: Allochernes; Beier, 1932

= Allochernes =

Genus of pseudoscorpions

Allochernes is a genus of pseudoscorpions belonging to the family Chernetidae.

The genus was first described by Beier in 1932.

The species of this genus are found in Europe and Japan.

Species:

- Allochernes aetnaeus Beier, 1975
- Allochernes bactrinus Dashdamirov & Schawaller, 1995
