= Chrysochernes =

Scientific classification
- Domain: Eukaryota
- Kingdom: Animalia
- Phylum: Arthropoda
- Subphylum: Chelicerata
- Class: Arachnida
- Order: Pseudoscorpiones
- Family: Chernetidae
- Subfamily: Chernetinae
- Genus: Chrysochernes; Hoff, 1956

Species
- Chrysochernes elatus Hoff, 1956; Chrysochernes elegans Hoff, 1956

Genus of pseudoscorpions

Chrysochernes is a genus of pseudoscorpions in the subfamily Chernetinae.
