= Marachernes perup =

Scientific classification
- Kingdom: Animalia
- Phylum: Arthropoda
- Subphylum: Chelicerata
- Class: Arachnida
- Order: Pseudoscorpiones
- Family: Chernetidae
- Genus: Marachernes
- Species: M. perup

Binomial name
- Marachernes perup Harvey, 1992

Species of pseudoscorpion

Marachernes perup is a species of pseudoscorpion in the Chernetidae family. It is endemic to Australia. It was described in 1992 by Australian arachnologist Mark Harvey. The specific epithet perup refers to the type locality.

== Description ==
The body length of the female holotype is 2.66 mm. The colour is mainly dark yellow-brown, with the front of the carapace and pedipalps dark red-brown.

== Distribution and habitat ==
The species occurs in south-west Western Australia. The type locality is Perup Nature Reserve, some 40 km east of Manjimup, where the holotype was collected from beneath the bark of jarrah logs.

== Behaviour ==
The pseudoscorpions are terrestrial predators.
