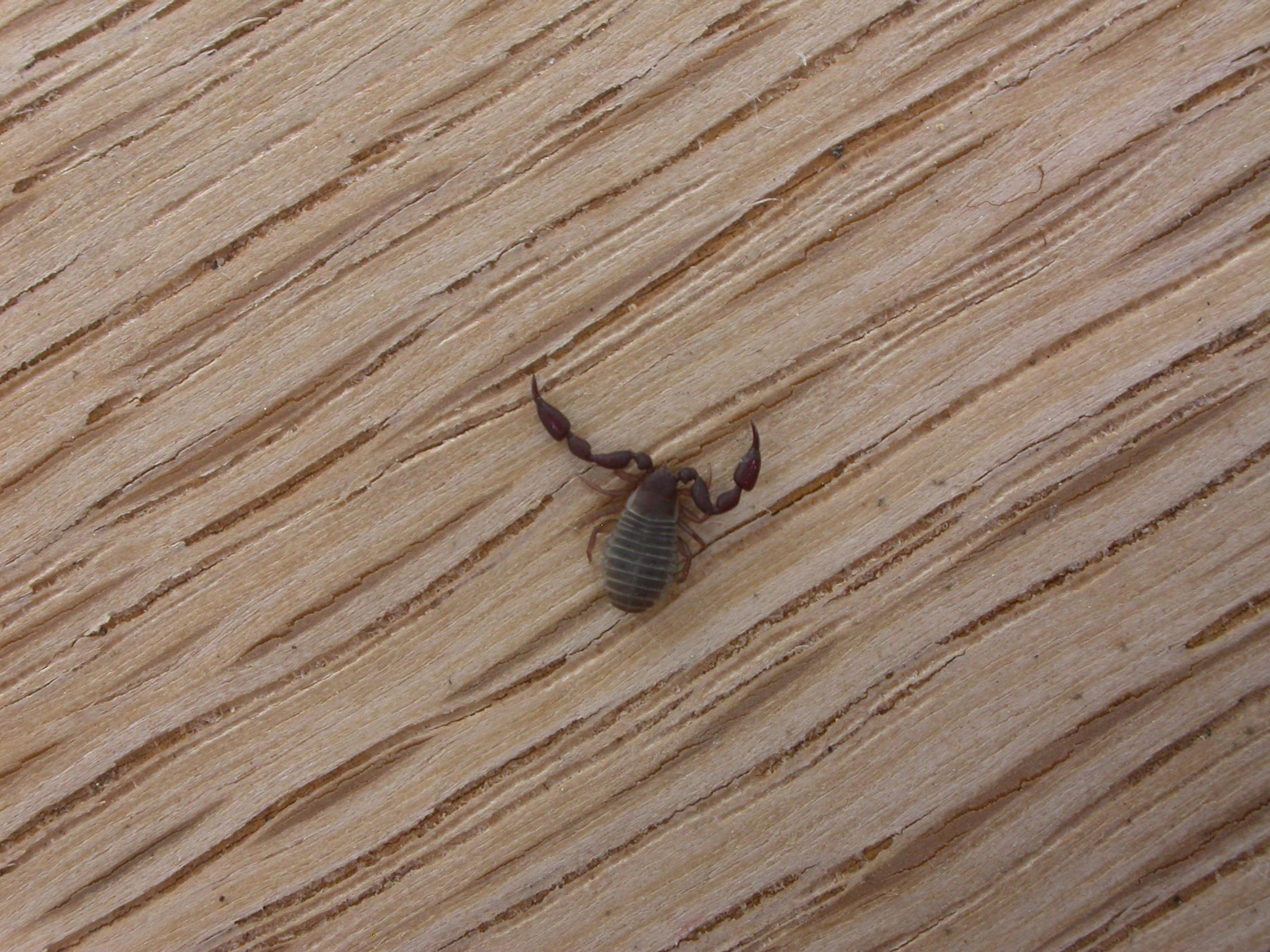
- Conicochernes sp.

Scientific classification
- Kingdom: Animalia
- Phylum: Arthropoda
- Subphylum: Chelicerata
- Class: Arachnida
- Order: Pseudoscorpiones
- Family: Chernetidae
- Genus: Conicochernes; Beier, 1948

Type species
- Chelifer brevispinosus L.Koch & Keyserling, 1885

= Conicochernes =

Genus of pseudoscorpions

Conicochernes is a genus of pseudoscorpions in the Chernetidae family. It is endemic to Australia. It was described in 1948 by Austrian arachnologist Max Beier.

== Species ==
The genus contains the following species:

- Conicochernes brevispinosus (L.Koch and Keyserling, 1885)
- Conicochernes crassus Beier, 1954
- Conicochernes doyleae Kennedy, 1990
- Conicochernes globosus Beier, 1954
- Conicochernes incrassatus (Beier, 1933)
