= Austrochernes =

Scientific classification
- Domain: Eukaryota
- Kingdom: Animalia
- Phylum: Arthropoda
- Subphylum: Chelicerata
- Class: Arachnida
- Order: Pseudoscorpiones
- Family: Chernetidae
- Subfamily: Chernetinae
- Genus: Austrochernes; Beier, 1932

Type species
- Austrochernes australiensis (With, 1905)

Genus of pseudoscorpions

Austrochernes is a genus of pseudoscorpions in the subfamily Chernetinae, first described by Max Beier in 1932. Species of this genus are found in mainland Australia and New Guinea. The Australian Faunal Directory decisions for synonymy are based on a 2018 paper by Mark Harvey.

== Species ==
Species of this genus include:

- Austrochernes australiensis (With, 1905)
- Austrochernes cruciatus (Volschenk, 2007)
- Austrochernes dewae (Beier, 1967)
- Austrochernes guanophilus (Beier, 1967)
- Austrochernes imitans (Beier, 1969)
- Austrochernes novaeguineae (Beier, 1965)
- Austrochernes omorgus (Harvey & Volschenk, 2007)
