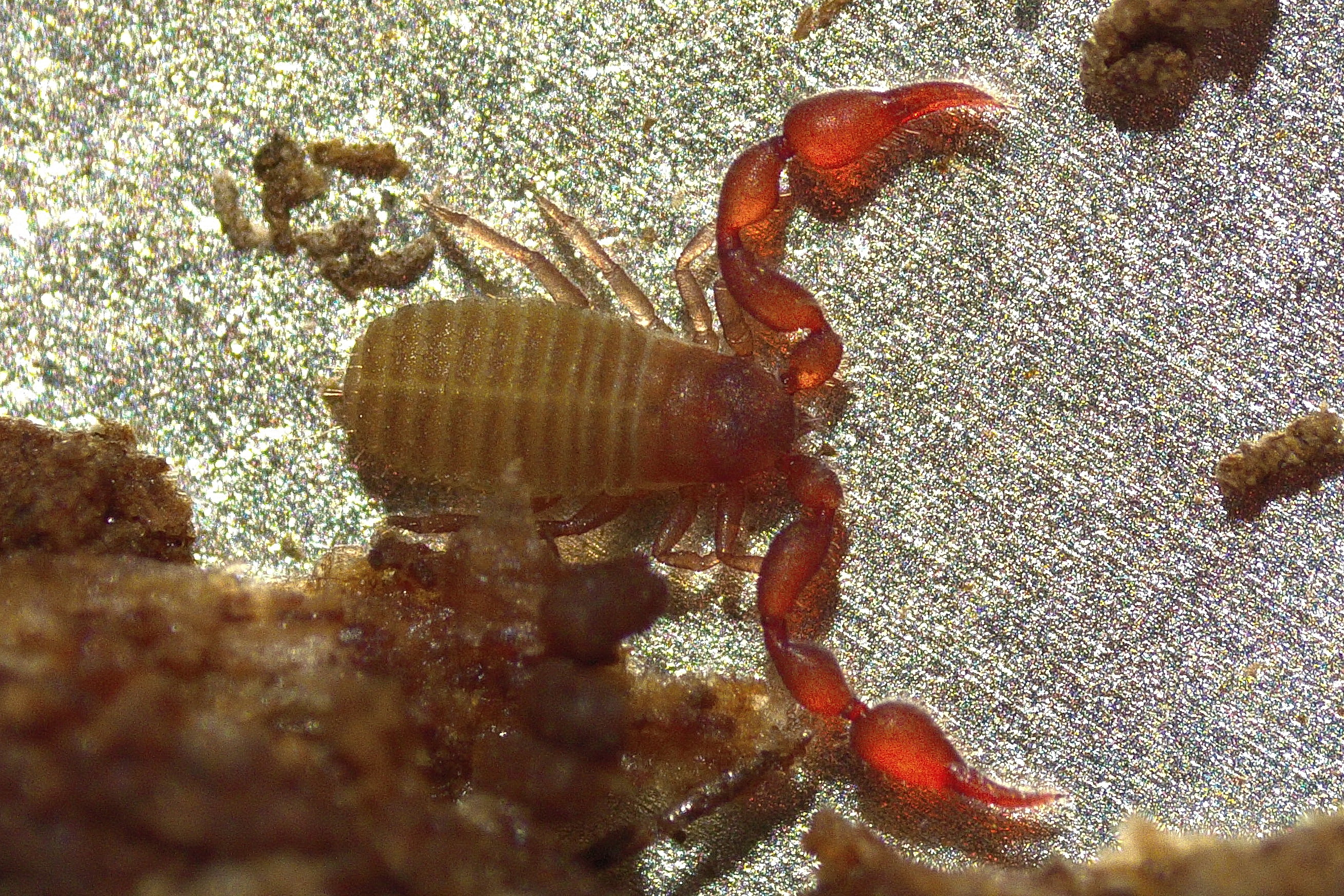
- pseudoscorpion - Pselaphochernes scorpioides

Scientific classification
- Kingdom: Animalia
- Phylum: Arthropoda
- Subphylum: Chelicerata
- Class: Arachnida
- Order: Pseudoscorpiones
- Family: Chernetidae
- Genus: Pselaphochernes; Beier, 1932

= Pselaphochernes =

Genus of pseudoscorpions

Pselaphochernes is a genus of pseudoscorpions belonging to the family Chernetidae.

The species of this genus are found in Europe and North America.

Species:

- Pselaphochernes anachoreta (Simon, 1878)
- Pselaphochernes balcanicus Beier, 1932
