= Paraustrochernes =

Scientific classification
- Kingdom: Animalia
- Phylum: Arthropoda
- Subphylum: Chelicerata
- Class: Arachnida
- Order: Pseudoscorpiones
- Family: Chernetidae
- Genus: Paraustrochernes; Beier, 1966

Type species
- Paraustrochernes victorianus Beier, 1966

Genus of pseudoscorpions

Paraustrochernes is a genus of pseudoscorpions in the Chernetidae family. It is native to Australasia, and was described in 1966 by Austrian arachnologist Max Beier.

== Species ==
The genus contains the following species:

- Paraustrochernes novaeguineensis Beier, 1975 – New Guinea
- Paraustrochernes victorianus Beier, 1966 – Australia
