= Illinichernes =

Scientific classification
- Domain: Eukaryota
- Kingdom: Animalia
- Phylum: Arthropoda
- Subphylum: Chelicerata
- Class: Arachnida
- Order: Pseudoscorpiones
- Family: Chernetidae
- Genus: Illinichernes; Hoff, 1949

Genus of pseudoscorpions

Illinichernes is a genus of pseudoscorpions in the family Chernetidae. There are at least two described species in Illinichernes.

== Species ==
These two species belong to the genus Illinichernes:

- Illinichernes distinctus Hoff, 1949
- Illinichernes stephensi Benedict & Malcolm, 1982
