= Sundochernes =

Scientific classification
- Kingdom: Animalia
- Phylum: Arthropoda
- Subphylum: Chelicerata
- Class: Arachnida
- Order: Pseudoscorpiones
- Family: Chernetidae
- Genus: Sundochernes; Beier, 1932

Type species
- Chelifer modiglianii Ellingsen, 1911

Genus of pseudoscorpions

Sundochernes is a genus of pseudoscorpions in the Chernetidae family. It was described in 1932 by Austrian arachnologist Max Beier.

== Species ==
The genus contains the following species:

- Sundochernes australiensis Beier, 1954
- Sundochernes brasiliensis Beier, 1974
- Sundochernes dubius Beier, 1954
- Sundochernes gressitti Beier, 1957
- Sundochernes malayanus Beier, 1963
- Sundochernes modiglianii (Ellingsen, 1911)
- Sundochernes queenslandicus Beier, 1975
