= Barbaraella =

Scientific classification
- Kingdom: Animalia
- Phylum: Arthropoda
- Subphylum: Chelicerata
- Class: Arachnida
- Order: Pseudoscorpiones
- Family: Chernetidae
- Genus: Barbaraella; Harvey, 1995

Type species
- Barbaraella mainae Harvey, 1995

Genus of pseudoscorpions

Barbaraella is a monotypic genus of pseudoscorpions in the Chernetidae family. It is endemic to Australia, and was described in 1995 by Australian arachnologist Mark Harvey.

== Etymology ==
The generic (Barbaraella) and specific (mainae) epithets honour arachnologist Barbara York Main (1929–2019) for her contributions to arachnology and for inspiring a generation of enthusiasts.

== Species ==
The genus contains the single species Barbaraella mainae Harvey, 1995.

=== Description ===
The body length of males is 2.67–3.26 mm; that of females is 3.79–3.82 mm. The colour is mainly pale yellow, with the pedipalps pale reddish-brown.

=== Distribution and habitat ===
The species occurs in the Kimberley region of North West Australia. The type locality is the Kalumburu Mission. The pseudoscorpions were found under banana fronds.
