= Dendrochernes =

Scientific classification
- Domain: Eukaryota
- Kingdom: Animalia
- Phylum: Arthropoda
- Subphylum: Chelicerata
- Class: Arachnida
- Order: Pseudoscorpiones
- Family: Chernetidae
- Genus: Dendrochernes; Beier, 1932

Genus of pseudoscorpions

Dendrochernes is a genus of arachnids belonging to the family Chernetidae.

The species of this genus are found in Europe and Northern America.

Species:

- Dendrochernes crassus Hoff, 1956
