= Nesochernes =

Scientific classification
- Kingdom: Animalia
- Phylum: Arthropoda
- Subphylum: Chelicerata
- Class: Arachnida
- Order: Pseudoscorpiones
- Family: Chernetidae
- Genus: Nesochernes; Beier, 1932

Type species
- Nesochernes gracilis Beier, 1932

Genus of pseudoscorpions

Nesidiochernes is a monotypic genus of pseudoscorpions in the Chernetidae family. It is native to Oceania, and was described in 1932 by Austrian arachnologist Max Beier.

== Species ==
The genus contains the single species Nesochernes gracilis Beier, 1932, of which there are two subspecies:

- Nesochernes gracilis gracilis Beier, 1932 – New Zealand
- Nesochernes gracilis norfolkensis Beier, 1976 – Norfolk Island
