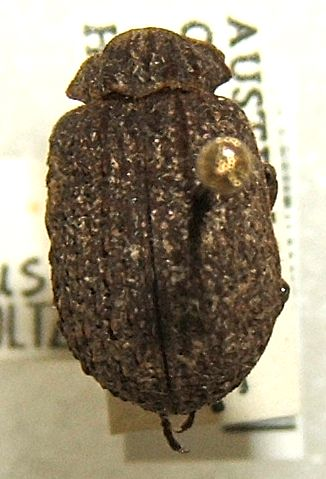
- Omorgus costatus, adult

Scientific classification
- Kingdom: Animalia
- Phylum: Arthropoda
- Class: Insecta
- Order: Coleoptera
- Suborder: Polyphaga
- Infraorder: Scarabaeiformia
- Family: Trogidae
- Genus: Omorgus
- Species: O. costatus

Binomial name
- Omorgus costatus (Wiedemann, 1823)

Synonyms
- Trox costatus Trox montalbanensis Trox regularis Trox velutinus

= Omorgus costatus =

Species of beetle

Omorgus costatus is a species of beetle of the family Trogidae that occurs in Australia, Tasmania, the Solomon Islands, New Guinea, Vietnam, Java, India, and China.
