= Nesidiochernes =

Scientific classification
- Kingdom: Animalia
- Phylum: Arthropoda
- Subphylum: Chelicerata
- Class: Arachnida
- Order: Pseudoscorpiones
- Family: Chernetidae
- Genus: Nesidiochernes; Beier, 1957

Type species
- Nesidiochernes maculatus Beier, 1957

Genus of pseudoscorpions

Nesidiochernes is a genus of pseudoscorpions in the Chernetidae family. It was described in 1957 by Austrian arachnologist Max Beier.

== Species ==
The genus contains the following species:

- Nesidiochernes australicus Beier, 1966
- Nesidiochernes caledonicus Beier, 1964
- Nesidiochernes carolinensis Beier, 1957
  - Nesidiochernes carolinensis carolinensis Beier, 1957
  - Nesidiochernes carolinensis dybasi Beier, 1957
- Nesidiochernes insociabilis Beier, 1957
- Nesidiochernes kuscheli Beier, 1976
- Nesidiochernes maculatus Beier, 1957
- Nesidiochernes novaeguineae Beier, 1965
- Nesidiochernes palauensis Beier, 1957
- Nesidiochernes plurisetosus Beier, 1965
- Nesidiochernes robustus Beier, 1957
- Nesidiochernes scutulatus Beier, 1969
- Nesidiochernes slateri Beier, 1975
- Nesidiochernes tumidimanus Beier, 1957
- Nesidiochernes zealandicus Beier, 1966
