= Americhernes =

Scientific classification
- Kingdom: Animalia
- Phylum: Arthropoda
- Subphylum: Chelicerata
- Class: Arachnida
- Order: Pseudoscorpiones
- Family: Chernetidae
- Genus: Americhernes; Muchmore, 1976

Type species
- Chelifer oblongus Say, 1821

Genus of pseudoscorpions

Americhernes is a genus of pseudoscorpions in the Chernetidae family. It was described in 1976 by American arachnologist William Muchmore.

== Species ==
The genus contains the following species:

- Americhernes andinus (Beier, 1959)
- Americhernes bethaniae Mahnert, 1979
- Americhernes chilensis (Beier, 1964)
- Americhernes eidmanni (Beier, 1935)
- Americhernes ellipticus (Hoff, 1944)
- Americhernes guarany (Feio, 1946)
- Americhernes incertus Mahnert, 1979
- Americhernes kanaka (Chamberlin, 1938)
- Americhernes levipalpus (Muchmore, 1972)
- Americhernes longimanus Muchmore, 1976
- Americhernes mahnerti Harvey, 1990
- Americhernes muchmorei Harvey, 1990
- Americhernes neboissi Harvey, 1990
- Americhernes oblongus (Say, 1821)
- Americhernes orestes Harvey, 1990
- Americhernes ovatus (Balzan, 1892)
- Americhernes paluma Harvey, 1990
- Americhernes perproximus (Beier, 1962)
- Americhernes plaumanni (Beier, 1974)
- Americhernes puertoricensis Muchmore, 1976
- Americhernes reductus Muchmore, 1976
- Americhernes samoanus (Chamberlin, 1938)
- Americhernes suraiurana (Feio, 1945)
