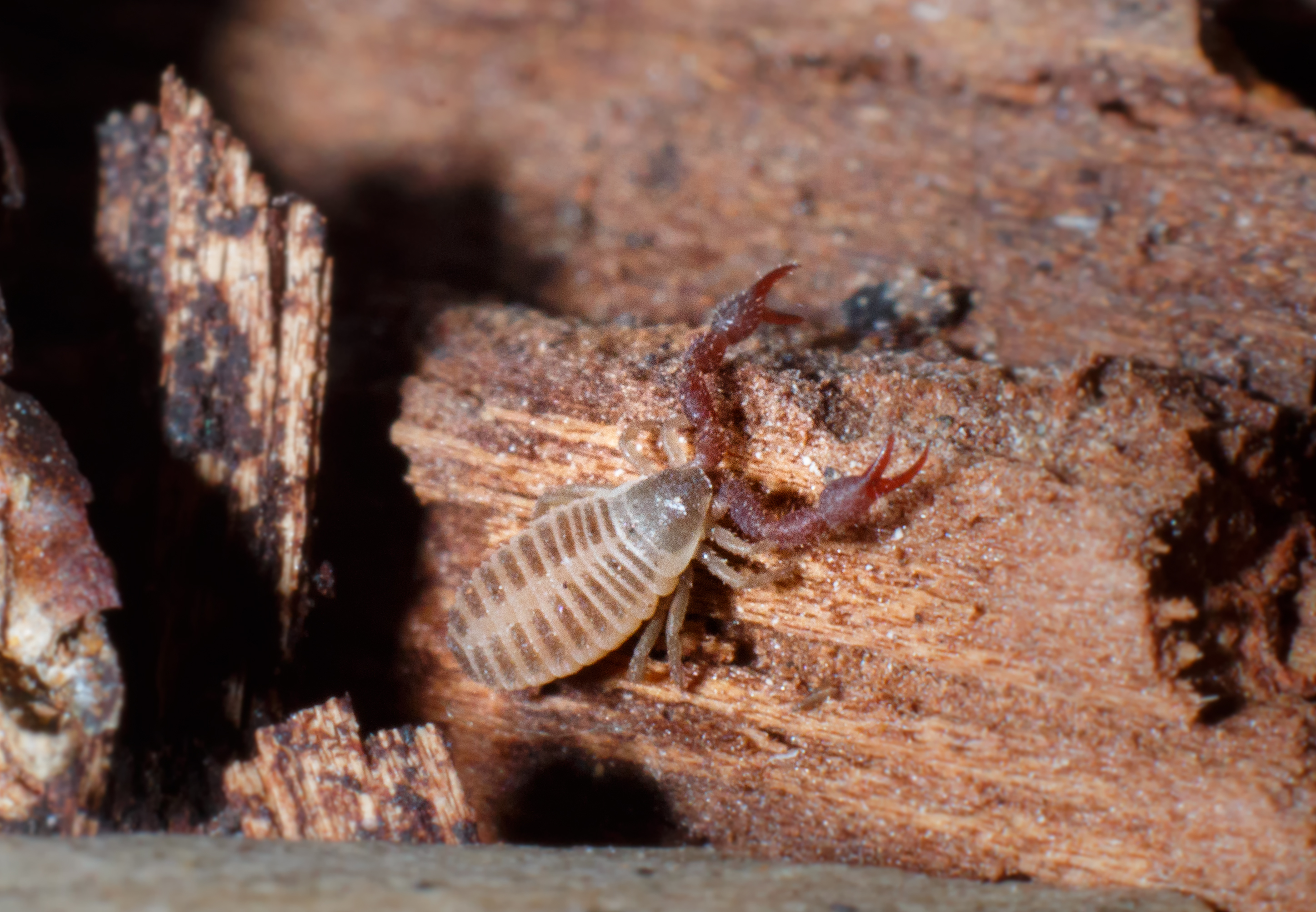
- Chernes cimicoides

Scientific classification
- Kingdom: Animalia
- Phylum: Arthropoda
- Subphylum: Chelicerata
- Class: Arachnida
- Order: Pseudoscorpiones
- Family: Chernetidae
- Genus: Chernes; Menge, 1855

= Chernes =

Genus of pseudoscorpions

Chernes is a genus of pseudoscorpions belonging to the family Chernetidae.

The genus was first described by Menge in 1855.

The species of this genus are found in Europe and Northern America.

Species:

- Chernes cimicoides (Fabricius, 1793)
