= Satrapanus =

Scientific classification
- Kingdom: Animalia
- Phylum: Arthropoda
- Subphylum: Chelicerata
- Class: Arachnida
- Order: Pseudoscorpiones
- Family: Chernetidae
- Genus: Satrapanus; Harvey & Volschenk, 2007

Type species
- Sundochernes grayi Beier, 1976

Genus of pseudoscorpions

Satrapanus is a monotypic genus of pseudoscorpions in the Chernetidae family. It is endemic to Australia's Lord Howe Island in the Tasman Sea. It was described in 2007 by Australian arachnologists Mark Harvey and Erich Volschenk. The generic epithet comes from the Latin satrapa ('provincial governor') with reference to the pseudoscorpion being the only known species of the genus on the island.

== Species ==
The genus contains the sole species Satrapanus grayi, which was described by Austrian arachnologist Max Beier in 1976.

=== Description ===
Body lengths of males are 1.68–2.03 mm; those of females 1.91–2.78 mm. The colour is mainly dark reddish-brown.

=== Distribution and habitat ===
The species is known only from Lord Howe Island, where it inhabits plant litter and other ground habitats.

=== Behaviour ===
The pseudoscorpions are terrestrial predators.
