= Haplochernes =

Scientific classification
- Kingdom: Animalia
- Phylum: Arthropoda
- Subphylum: Chelicerata
- Class: Arachnida
- Order: Pseudoscorpiones
- Family: Chernetidae
- Genus: Haplochernes; Beier, 1932

Type species
- Chelifer bonicus Karsch, 1881

Genus of pseudoscorpions

Haplochernes is a genus of pseudoscorpions in the Chernetidae family. It was described in 1932 by Austrian arachnologist Max Beier.

== Species ==
The genus contains the following species:

- Haplochernes aterrimus Beier, 1948
- Haplochernes atrimanus (Kästner, 1927)
- Haplochernes boncicus (Karsch, 1881)
  - Haplochernes boncicus boncicus (Karsch, 1881)
  - Haplochernes boncicus hagai Morikawa, 1953
- Haplochernes boninensis Beier, 1957
- Haplochernes buxtoni (Kästner, 1927)
- Haplochernes dahli Beier, 1932
- Haplochernes ellenae Chamberlin, 1938
- Haplochernes funafutensis (With, 1907)
- Haplochernes hebridicus Beier, 1940
- Haplochernes insulanus Beier, 1957
- Haplochernes kraepelini (Tullgren, 1905)
- Haplochernes madagascariensis Beier, 1932
- Haplochernes nanus Mahnert, 1975
- Haplochernes norfolkensis Beier, 1976
- Haplochernes ramosus (L. Koch and Keyserling, 1885)
- Haplochernes warburgi (Tullgren, 1905)
- Haplochernes wuzhiensis Gao and Zhang, 2017
