= Hesperochernes =

Scientific classification
- Kingdom: Animalia
- Phylum: Arthropoda
- Subphylum: Chelicerata
- Class: Arachnida
- Order: Pseudoscorpiones
- Family: Chernetidae
- Genus: Hesperochernes

Genus of pseudoscorpions

Hesperochernes is a genus of pseudoscorpions in the family of Chernetidae.

== Distribution ==
The species of this genus are found in North America, the Antilles and Japan.

== List of species ==
According to Pseudoscorpions of the World 1.2:

- Hesperochernes canadensis Hoff, 1945
- Hesperochernes globosus (Ellingsen, 1910)
- Hesperochernes holsingeri Muchmore, 1994
- Hesperochernes inusitatus Hoff, 1946
- Hesperochernes laurae Chamberlin, 1924
- Hesperochernes mimulus Chamberlin, 1952
- Hesperochernes mirabilis (Banks, 1895)
- Hesperochernes molestus Hoff, 1956
- Hesperochernes montanus Chamberlin, 1935
- Hesperochernes occidentalis (Hoff & Bolsterli, 1956)
- Hesperochernes pallipes (Banks, 1893)
- Hesperochernes paludis (Moles, 1914)
- Hesperochernes riograndensis Hoff & Clawson, 1952
- Hesperochernes shinjoensis Sato, 1983
- Hesperochernes tamiae Beier, 1930
- Hesperochernes thomomysi Hoff, 1948
- Hesperochernes tumidus Beier, 1933
- Hesperochernes unicolor (Banks, 1908)
- Hesperochernes utahensis Hoff & Clawson, 1952
- Hesperochernes vespertilionis Beier, 1976

== Publications ==
- Chamberlin, 1924 : Hesperochernes laurae, a new species of false scorpion from California inhabiting the nest of Vespa. Pan-Pacific Entomologist, vol. 1, p. 89-92.
