= Marachernes =

Scientific classification
- Kingdom: Animalia
- Phylum: Arthropoda
- Subphylum: Chelicerata
- Class: Arachnida
- Order: Pseudoscorpiones
- Family: Chernetidae
- Genus: Marachernes; Harvey, 1992

Type species
- Marachernes bellus Harvey, 1992

Genus of pseudoscorpions

Marachernes is a genus of pseudoscorpions in the Chernetidae family. It is endemic to Australia. It was described in 1992 by Australian arachnologist Mark Harvey. The genus name honours Māra Blosfelds for her contributions to the collection of the type species, combined with Chernes, the type genus of the family.

== Species ==
The genus contains the following species:

- Marachernes bellus Harvey, 1992
- Marachernes perup Harvey, 1992
- Marachernes simulans Harvey, 1992
