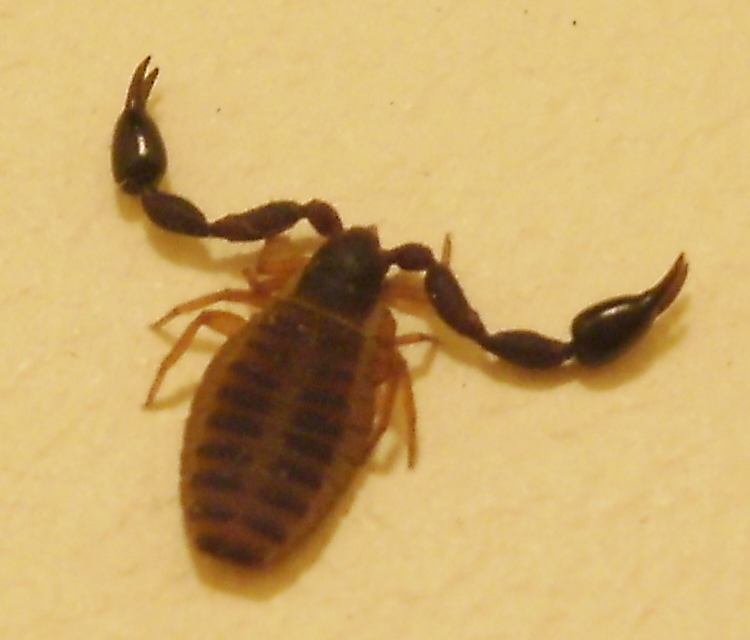
- Apatochernes sp.

Scientific classification
- Domain: Eukaryota
- Kingdom: Animalia
- Phylum: Arthropoda
- Subphylum: Chelicerata
- Class: Arachnida
- Order: Pseudoscorpiones
- Superfamily: Cheliferoidea
- Family: Chernetidae; Menge, 1855

Subfamilies
- Chernetinae; Goniochernetinae; Lamprochernetinae

= Chernetidae =

Chernetidae Temporal range: Cretaceous–present

Family of pseudoscorpions

Chernetidae is a family of pseudoscorpions, first described by Anton Menge in 1855.

== Genera ==
As of October 2023, the World Pseudoscorpiones Catalog accepts the following 119 genera:

- Acanthicochernes Beier, 1964
- Acuminochernes Hoff, 1949
- Adelphochernes Beier, 1937
- Allochernes Beier, 1932
- Americhernes Muchmore, 1976
- Anaperochernes Beier, 1964
- Anthrenochernes Lohmander, 1939
- Antillochernes Muchmore, 1984
- Apatochernes Beier, 1948
- Asterochernes Beier, 1955
- Atherochernes Beier, 1954
- Attaleachernes Mahnert, 2009
- Austinochernes Harvey, 2021
- Austrochernes Beier, 1932
- Balgachernes Harvey, 2018
- Barbaraella Harvey, 1995
- Bipeltochernes Dashdamirov, 2005
- Bituberochernes Muchmore, 1974
- Byrsochernes Beier, 1959
- Cacoxylus Beier, 1965
- Caffrowithius Beier, 1932
- Calidiochernes Beier, 1954
- Calymmachernes Beier, 1954
- Caribochernes Beier, 1976
- Ceratochernes Mahnert, 1994
- Ceriochernes Beier, 1937
- Chelanops Gervais, 1849
- Chelodamus Chamberlin, R.V., 1925
- Chernes Menge, 1855
- Chiridiochernes Muchmore, 1972
- Chrysochernes Hoff, 1956
- Cocinachernes Hentschel & Muchmore, 1989
- Conicochernes Beier, 1948
- Cordylochernes Beier, 1932
- Corosoma Karsch, 1879
- Corticochernes Tooren, 2008
- Cyclochernes Beier, 1970
- Dasychernes Chamberlin, 1929
- Dendrochernes Beier, 1932
- Dinocheirus Chamberlin, 1929
- Dinochernes Beier, 1933
- Diplothrixochernes Beier, 1962
- Epactiochernes Muchmore, 1974
- Epichernes Muchmore, 1982
- Eumecochernes Beier, 1932
- Gelachernes Beier, 1940
- Gigantochernes Beier, 1932
- Gomphochernes Beier, 1932
- Goniochernes Beier, 1932
- Haplochernes Beier, 1932
- Hebridochernes Beier, 1940
- Hesperochernes Chamberlin, 1924
- Heterochernes Beier, 1966
- Hexachernes Beier, 1953
- Illinichernes Hoff, 1949
- Incachernes Beier, 1933
- Indochernes Murthy & Ananthakrishnan, 1977
- Interchernes Muchmore, 1980
- Lamprochernes Tömösváry, 1883
- Lasiochernes Beier, 1932
- Lustrochernes Beier, 1932
- Macrochernes Hoff, 1946
- Maorichernes Beier, 1932
- Marachernes Harvey, 1992
- Maxchernes Feio, 1960
- Megachernes Beier, 1932
- Meiochernes Beier, 1957
- Mesochernes Beier, 1932
- Metagoniochernes Vachon, 1939
- Mexachernes Hoff, 1947
- Mirochernes Beier, 1930
- Mucrochernes Muchmore, 1973
- Myrmochernes Tullgren, 1907
- Neoallochernes Hoff, 1947
- Neochelanops Beier, 1964
- Neochernes Beier, 1932
- Nesidiochernes Beier, 1957
- Nesiotochernes Beier, 1976
- Nesochernes Beier, 1932
- Nudochernes Beier, 1935
- Ochrochernes Beier, 1932
- Odontochernes Beier, 1932
- Opsochernes Beier, 1966
- Orochernes Beier, 1968
- Pachychernes Beier, 1932
- Paracanthicochernes Beier, 1966
- Parachernes Chamberlin, 1931
- Parapilanus Beier, 1973
- Paraustrochernes Beier, 1966
- Parazaona Beier, 1932
- Petterchernes Heurtault, 1986
- Phaulochernes Beier, 1976
- Phymatochernes Mahnert, 1979
- Pilanus Beier, 1930
- Pselaphochernes Beier, 1932
- Pseudopilanus Beier, 1957
- Reischekia Beier, 1948
- Rhinochernes Beier, 1955
- Rhopalochernes Beier, 1932
- Satrapanus Harvey & Volschenk, 2007
- Selachochernes Mahnert, 2011
- Semeiochernes Beier, 1932
- Smeringochernes Beier, 1957
- Spelaeochernes Mahnert, 2001
- Sphenochernes Turk, 1953
- Sundochernes Beier, 1932
- Sundowithius Beier, 1932
- Systellochernes Beier, 1964
- Tenebriochernes Bedoya-Roqueme & Torres, 2019
- Teratochernes Beier, 1957
- Thalassochernes Beier, 1940
- Thapsinochernes Beier, 1957
- Tuberochernes Muchmore, 1997
- Tychochernes Hoff, 1956
- Verrucachernes Chamberlin, 1947
- Wyochernes Hoff, 1949
- Xenochernes Feio, 1945
- Zaona Chamberlin, 1925
- †Oligochernes Beier, 1937
