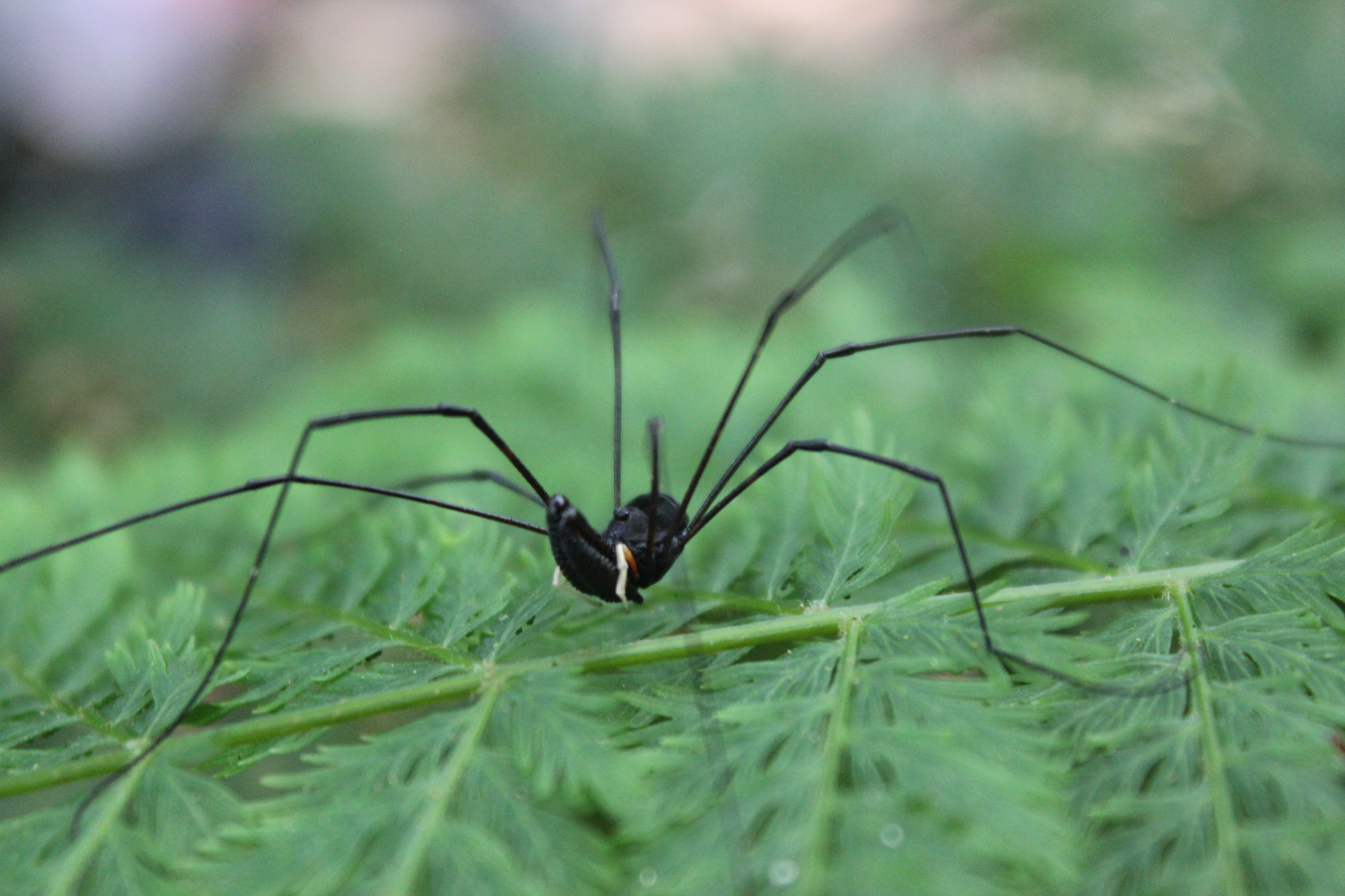

Scientific classification
- Kingdom: Animalia
- Phylum: Arthropoda
- Subphylum: Chelicerata
- Class: Arachnida
- Order: Opiliones
- Family: Neopilionidae
- Genus: Pantopsalis
- Species: P. cheliferoides

Binomial name
- Pantopsalis cheliferoides (Colenso, 1883)

Synonyms
- Phalangium cheliferoides Colenso, 1883

= Pantopsalis cheliferoides =

Species of harvestman endemic to New Zealand

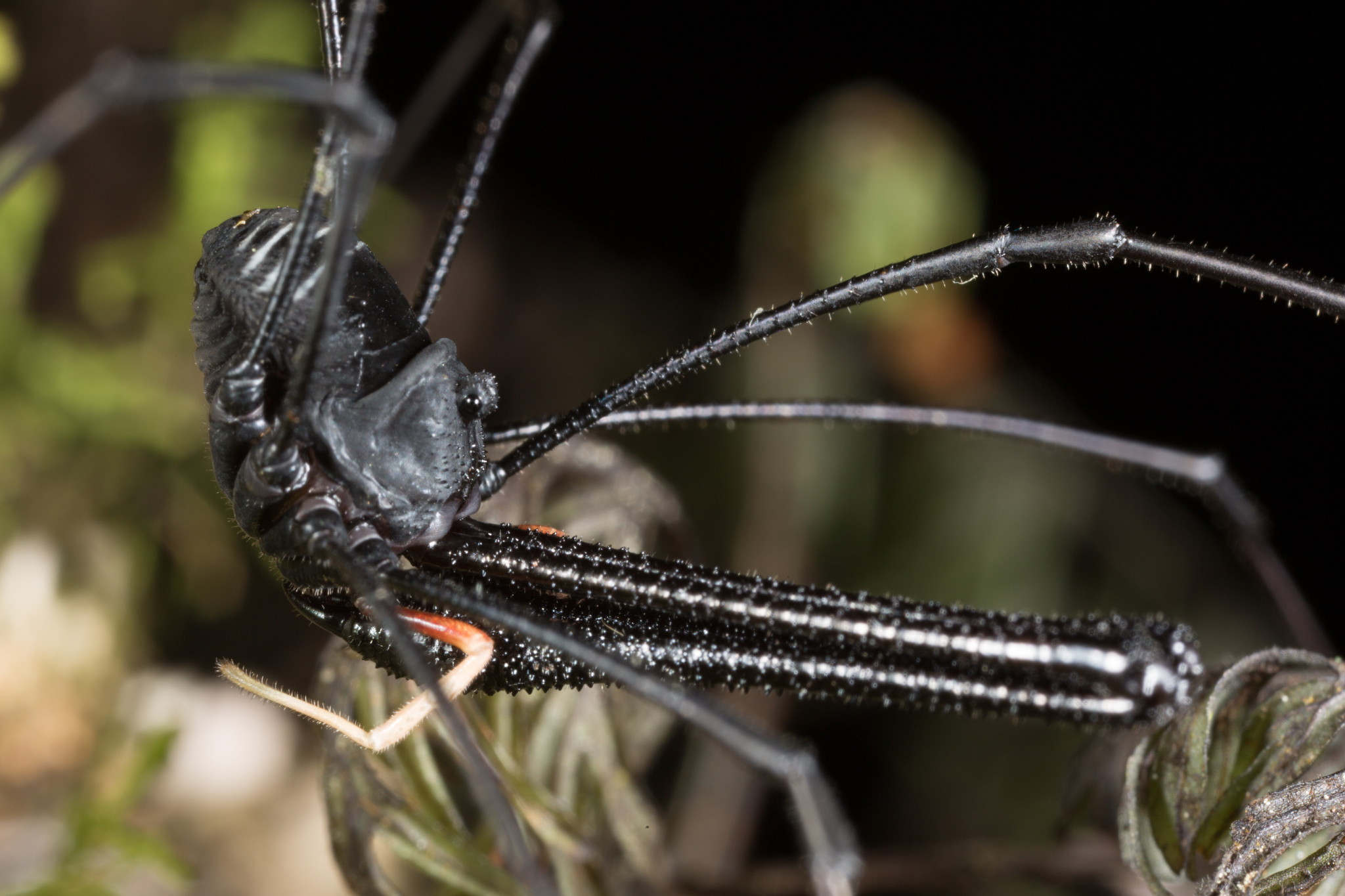
Male with long chelicerae

Pantopsalis cheliferoides is a species of Neopilionid harvestmen. This species was originally described by William Colenso and is endemic to New Zealand.

== Description ==
P. cheliferoides is a dark-coloured harvestman. They are extremely sexual dimorphic: males have exaggerated chelicerae (jaws), which are reduced in females. As with several other species of the genus Pantopsalis, the male chelicerae have two morphs or forms, long and short. Unusually, the morph with shorter chelicerae are not merely a scaled-down version of the long morph, but instead are stout and exaggerated in the width of the second segment.

== Range ==
Pantopsalis cheliferoides is endemic to New Zealand. It is found on both of the main islands of New Zealand, according to GBIF occurrence data.

== Behaviour ==
Males of P. cheliferoides have jaws which take two forms: elongated or short and broad. The chelicerae are used for combat between males: males with long chelicerae use them for grappling, while males with short chelicerae stab or punch with them.

== Taxonomy ==
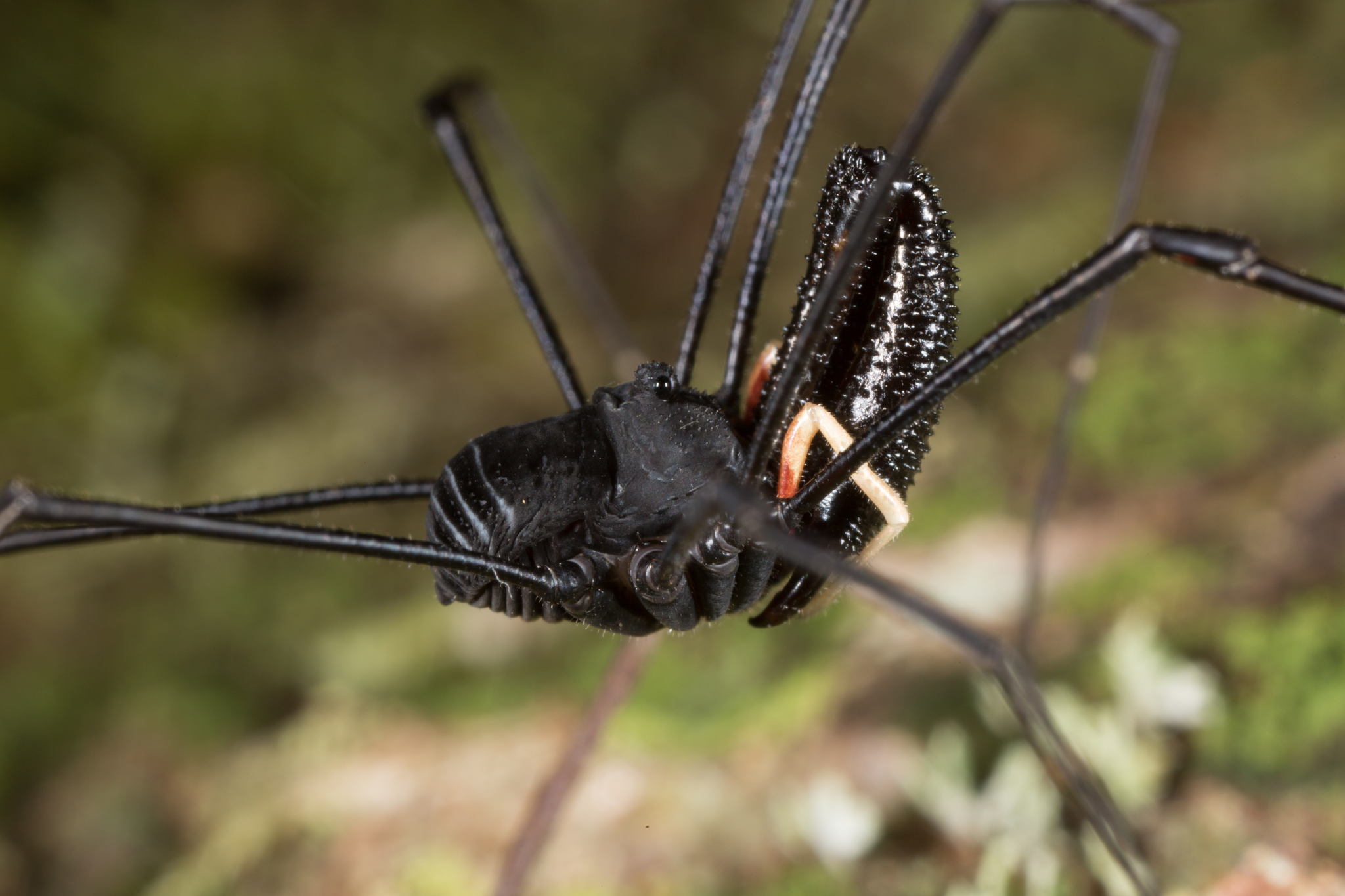
Male with short, broad chelicerae

This species was first described by Colenso in May 1883 under the name Phalangium cheliferoides. He used a specimen collected in Seventy Mile Bush, in the southern Wairarapa between Norsewood and Dannevirke. After first seeing one in 1879, he spent four years hunting for this species; he saw four individuals but was only able to capture one. The second individual he saw waved its chelicerae threateningly at him, and Colenso says "I, bearing in mind our small blackish katipo spider, was on my guard; perhaps too much so." The harvestman escaped. Finally Colenso captured a single specimen in 1881.

He chose the name cheliferoides as a reference to the pseudoscorpion genus Chelifer. In 2000 Cor Vink transferred Phalangium cheliferoides to the genus Pantopsalis after examining Colenso's holotype specimen, now held in Canterbury Museum. However, in 2004 the arachnologist Christopher K. Taylor declared this name nomen dubium because the holotype specimen was in such poor condition. In 2013, after examining specimens from various museums, Taylor redescribed the species, confirming that this species is distinct from similar species in the genus.
