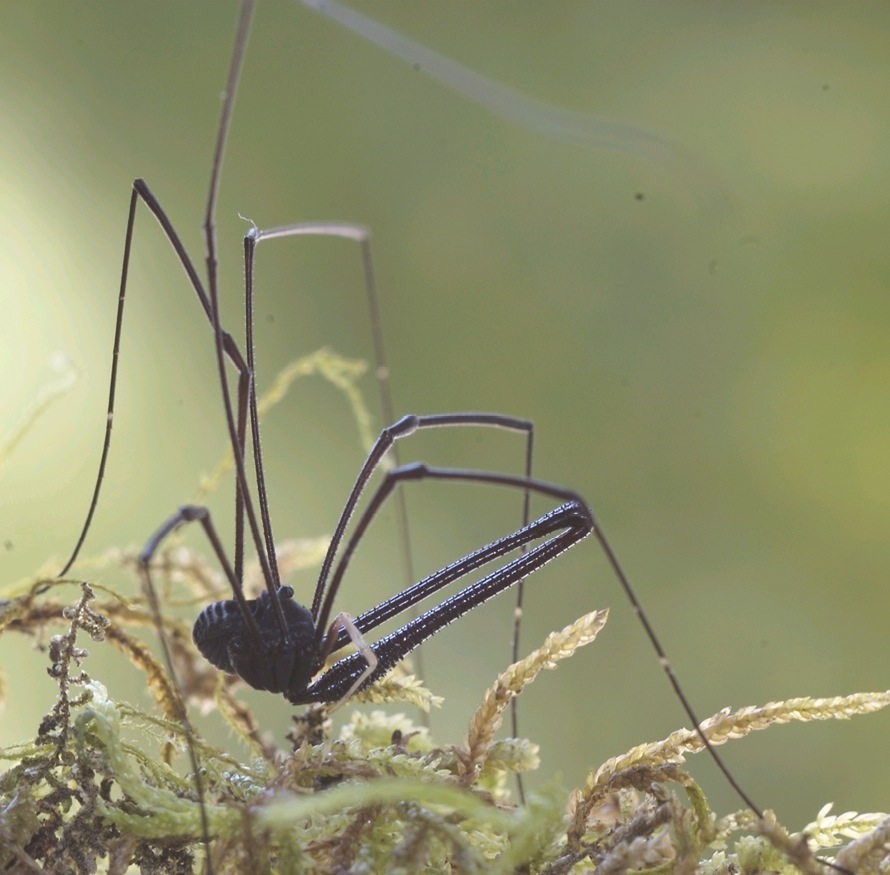
- Pantopsalis listeri

Scientific classification
- Kingdom: Animalia
- Phylum: Arthropoda
- Subphylum: Chelicerata
- Class: Arachnida
- Order: Opiliones
- Family: Neopilionidae
- Subfamily: Enantiobuninae
- Genus: Pantopsalis; Simon, 1879

Type species
- Phalangium listeri White, 1849

= Pantopsalis =

Genus of harvestmen/daddy longlegs

Pantopsalis is a genus of eleven species of harvestman in the family Neopilionidae. They are all endemic to New Zealand. Males of some species are notable for their enlarged chelicerae.

The following species are considered valid:

- Pantopsalis albipalpis Pocock 1902
- Pantopsalis cheliferoides (Colenso 1882)
- Pantopsalis coronata Pocock 1903
- Pantopsalis halli Hogg 1920
- Pantopsalis johnsi Forster 1964
- Pantopsalis listeri (White 1849)
- Pantopsalis luna (Forster 1944)
- Pantopsalis phocator Taylor 2004
- Pantopsalis pococki Hogg 1920
- Pantopsalis rennelli Forster 1964
