= Protochelifer brevidigitatus =

Scientific classification
- Kingdom: Animalia
- Phylum: Arthropoda
- Subphylum: Chelicerata
- Class: Arachnida
- Order: Pseudoscorpiones
- Family: Cheliferidae
- Genus: Protochelifer
- Species: P. brevidigitatus

Binomial name
- Protochelifer brevidigitatus (Tubb, 1937)

Synonyms
- Idiochelifer brevidigitatus Tubb, 1937

Species of pseudoscorpion

Protochelifer brevidigitatus is a species of pseudoscorpion in the Cheliferidae family. It is endemic to Australia. It was described in 1937 by Australian zoologist Alan Tubb.

== Description ==
The body length of the male holotype is 2.7 mm. The colour is dark brown.

== Distribution and habitat ==
The species occurs in Victoria. The type locality is Lady Julia Percy Island, where the holotype was found under a basalt boulder.

== Behaviour ==
The pseudoscorpions are terrestrial predators.
