= Protochelifer australis =

Scientific classification
- Kingdom: Animalia
- Phylum: Arthropoda
- Subphylum: Chelicerata
- Class: Arachnida
- Order: Pseudoscorpiones
- Family: Cheliferidae
- Genus: Protochelifer
- Species: P. australis

Binomial name
- Protochelifer australis (Tubb, 1937)

Synonyms
- Idiochelifer australis Tubb, 1937

Species of pseudoscorpion

Protochelifer australis is a species of pseudoscorpion in the Cheliferidae family. It is endemic to Australia. It was described in 1937 by Australian zoologist Alan Tubb.

== Description ==
The body length of a female syntype is 3.8 mm. The colour of the female is mainly dark brown, the legs and pedipalps paler; that of a male nearly black, legs and pedipalps light brown.

== Distribution and habitat ==
The species occurs in Victoria. The type locality is near Seal Bay on Lady Julia Percy Island, where the pseudoscorpions were found under stones.

== Behaviour ==
The pseudoscorpions are terrestrial predators.
