= Nannochelifer paralius =

Scientific classification
- Kingdom: Animalia
- Phylum: Arthropoda
- Subphylum: Chelicerata
- Class: Arachnida
- Order: Pseudoscorpiones
- Family: Cheliferidae
- Genus: Nannochelifer
- Species: N. paralius

Binomial name
- Nannochelifer paralius Harvey, 1984

Species of pseudoscorpion

Nannochelifer paralius is a species of pseudoscorpion in the Cheliferidae family. It is endemic to Australia. It was described in 1984 by Australian arachnologist Mark Harvey. The specific epithet paralius comes from the Greek paralios ('by or near the sea'), referring to the species’ habitat.

== Description ==
Body lengths of males are 1.3–1.4 mm; those of females 1.4–1.7 mm.

== Distribution and habitat ==
The species occurs in the Coral Sea Islands Territory. The type locality is Turtle Islet on Lihou Reef, where the pseudoscorpions were found in intertidal habitat beneath coral and beachrock rubble.

== Behaviour ==
The pseudoscorpions are terrestrial predators.
