= Philomaoria pallipes =

Scientific classification
- Kingdom: Animalia
- Phylum: Arthropoda
- Subphylum: Chelicerata
- Class: Arachnida
- Order: Pseudoscorpiones
- Family: Cheliferidae
- Genus: Philomaoria
- Species: P. pallipes

Binomial name
- Philomaoria pallipes (White, 1849)

Synonyms
- Chelifer pallipes White, 1849; Philomaoria novazealandica Chamberlin, 1931

Species of pseudoscorpion

Philomaoria pallipes is a species of pseudoscorpion in the Cheliferidae family. It was described in 1849 by Scottish zoologist Adam White.

== Distribution and habitat ==
The species occurs in New Zealand and on Australia's Lord Howe Island in the Tasman Sea. The type locality is simply 'New Zealand'. The pseudoscorpions inhabit plant litter.

== Behaviour ==
The pseudoscorpions are terrestrial predators.
