= Protochelifer naracoortensis =

Scientific classification
- Kingdom: Animalia
- Phylum: Arthropoda
- Subphylum: Chelicerata
- Class: Arachnida
- Order: Pseudoscorpiones
- Family: Cheliferidae
- Genus: Protochelifer
- Species: P. naracoortensis

Binomial name
- Protochelifer naracoortensis Beier, 1968

Species of pseudoscorpion

Protochelifer naracoortensis is a species of pseudoscorpion in the Cheliferidae family. It is endemic to Australia. It was described in 1968 by Austrian arachnologist Max Beier. The specific epithet naracoortensis refers to the type locality.

== Description ==
The body length of the holotype male is 2.7 mm; those of paratype females 3.3–3.4 mm. The colour is mainly reddish-brown.

== Distribution and habitat ==
The species occurs in the Limestone Coast region of south-eastern South Australia. The type locality is Bat Cave, Naracoorte Caves National Park.

== Behaviour ==
The pseudoscorpions are cave dwelling, terrestrial predators.
