= Protochelifer victorianus =

Scientific classification
- Kingdom: Animalia
- Phylum: Arthropoda
- Subphylum: Chelicerata
- Class: Arachnida
- Order: Pseudoscorpiones
- Family: Cheliferidae
- Genus: Protochelifer
- Species: P. victorianus

Binomial name
- Protochelifer victorianus Beier, 1966

Species of pseudoscorpion

Protochelifer victorianus is a species of pseudoscorpion in the Cheliferidae family. It is endemic to Australia. It was described in 1966 by Austrian arachnologist Max Beier.

== Distribution and habitat ==
The species occurs in Victoria. The type locality is Olsens Road, Poowong, South Gippsland, where the holotype was found under tree bark.

== Behaviour ==
The pseudoscorpions are terrestrial predators.
