= Protochelifer cavernarum =

Scientific classification
- Kingdom: Animalia
- Phylum: Arthropoda
- Subphylum: Chelicerata
- Class: Arachnida
- Order: Pseudoscorpiones
- Family: Cheliferidae
- Genus: Protochelifer
- Species: P. cavernarum

Binomial name
- Protochelifer cavernarum Beier, 1967

Synonyms
- Protochelifer cavernarum aitkeni Beier, 1968

Species of pseudoscorpion

Protochelifer cavernarum is a species of pseudoscorpion in the Cheliferidae family. It is endemic to Australia. It was described in 1967 by Austrian arachnologist Max Beier.

== Distribution and habitat ==
The species occurs in southern mainland Australia. The type locality is Murder Cave at the Cliefden Caves site, Mandurama, New South Wales.

== Behaviour ==
The pseudoscorpions are cave dwelling, terrestrial predators.
