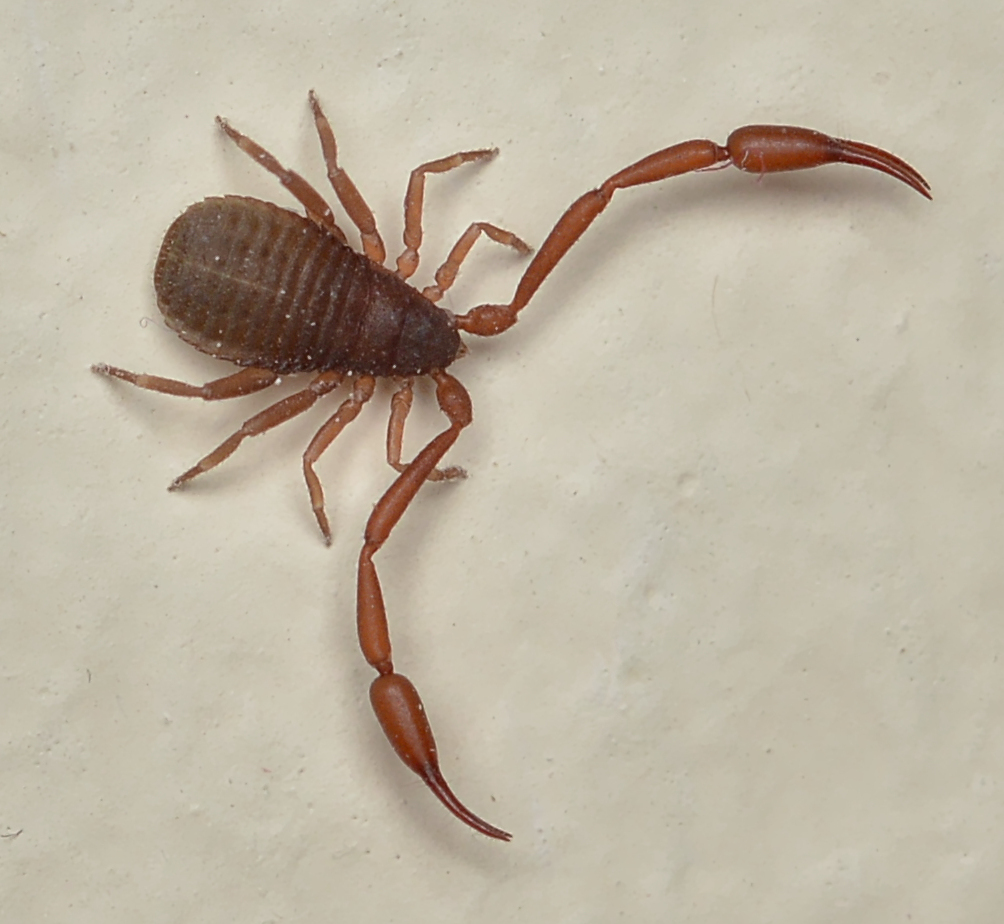

Scientific classification
- Kingdom: Animalia
- Phylum: Arthropoda
- Subphylum: Chelicerata
- Class: Arachnida
- Order: Pseudoscorpiones
- Family: Cheliferidae
- Genus: Chelifer; Geoffroy, 1762
- Species: C. cancroides

Binomial name
- Chelifer cancroides (Linnaeus, 1758)

= Chelifer cancroides =

Species of pseudoscorpion

Chelifer cancroides, the house pseudoscorpion, is a species of pseudoscorpion. It has a cosmopolitan distribution, and is mostly synanthropic and harmless to humans.

== Description ==
Chelifer cancroides measure 2.5–4.5 mm (0.098–0.177 in) in length. The pedipalps are very long, measuring 7–9 mm (0.28–0.35 in) when extended. The body is teardrop-shaped and has a rich mahogany color. The abdomen has 12 segments, only 10 of which are easily visible. The cephalothorax has one pair of eyes.

This species can be distinguished from other Cheliferidae by a number of features. The carapace has large setose tubercles. In males, the carapace and tergites I-VII or I-VIII have distinct lateral keels. The cheliceral hand has 4 setae, lacking seta sbs. The tarsal claws of adults have a lateroventral process, except for those on the first leg pair of adult males. Additionally, the subterminal tarsal setae are denticulate. In males, coxa IV is strongly arcuate, has a large lateral process, and has a coxal sac lacking a differentiated atrium. The male genitalia have rams horn organs and an anteriorly invaginated lateral rod forming a median depression, in which lies a sclerotic rod. The female genitalia have paired spermathecae and paired median cribriform plates.

== Taxonomy ==
Chelifer cancroides was one of the two pseudoscorpion species described by Linnaeus in the 10th edition of Systema Naturae. Both Species were assigned to the mite genus Acarus, then transferred to Phalangium by Linnaeus in 1767 and to Scorpio in 1775 by Fabricius. The genus Chelifer was described anonymously in 1762 to accommodate C. cancroides and has remained valid since. Since the genus was described over 300 species-group names have been described and all except C. cancroides have been moved to other genera or synonymized with C. cancroides. The genus is currently monotypic, although it contains fourteen species originally described in Chelifer that are considered nomina dubia and eleven other species considered nomina nuda.

== Diet ==
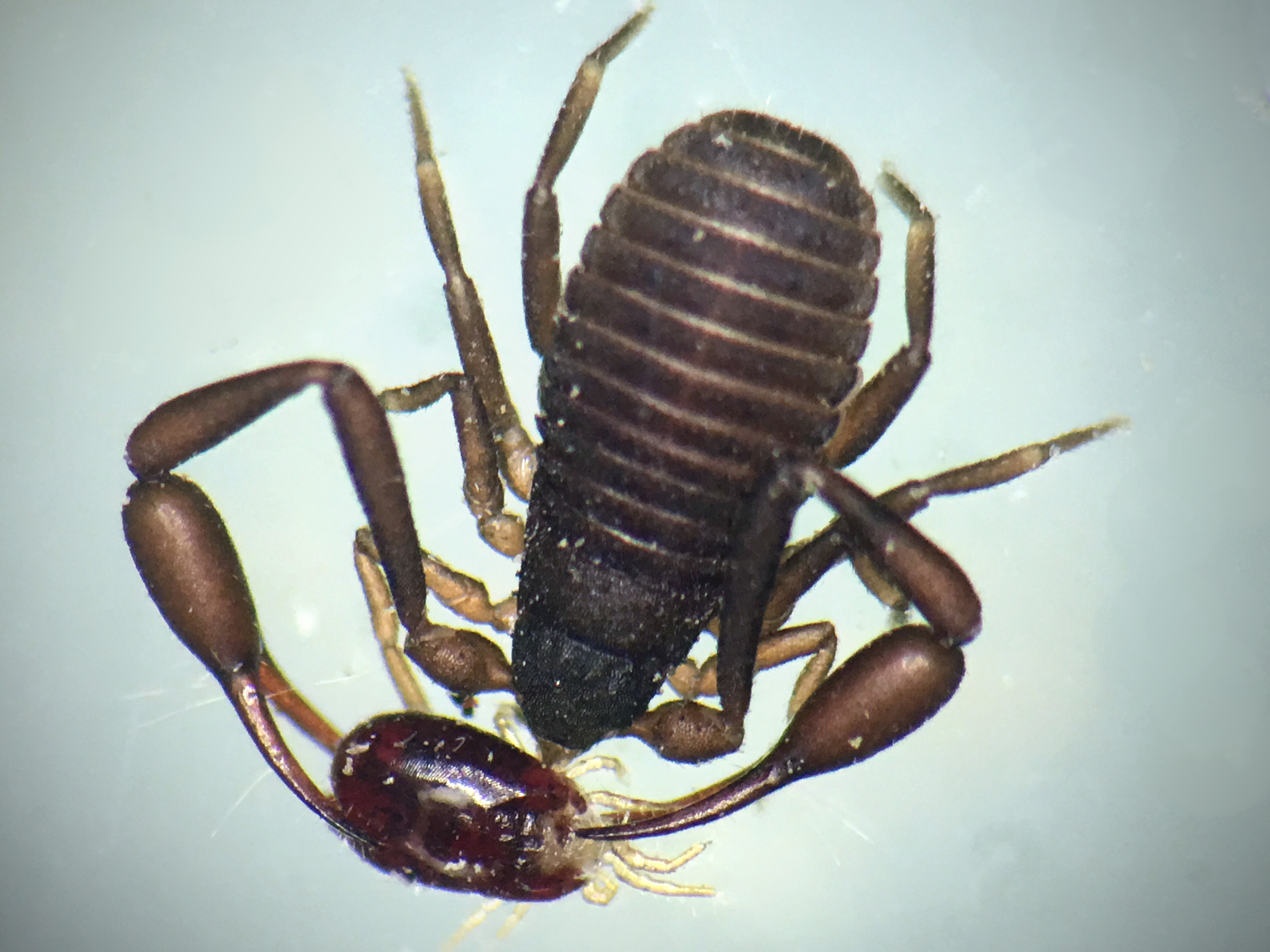
C. cancroides eating a Dermanyssus gallinae mite

Chelifer cancroides feeds on small arthropods such as psocids, fruit flies, and mites such as Varroa destructor.

== Reproduction ==
Males maintain small mating territories, few centimeters in size. When a female enters the territory, the male initiates a mating dance and eventually deposits a spermatophore, which is then picked up by the females. Fecundity is 20–40 eggs. The development from egg stage into maturity takes 10–24 months and requires three molts; molting may involve building a silk nest. They usually live three or four years.

== Distribution ==
Chelifer cancroides has been observed in North America, Europe, Africa, Australia and New Zealand.

== Habitat ==
Chelifer cancroides has been found under bark of trees, in caves, in bird nests, and in bee hives, and riding on bats, flies, and hymenopterans. It also occurs in human structures such as houses, stables, barns, chicken coops, and bee hives.

== Venom ==
Like some other pseudoscorpions, C. cancroides has venomous pedipalps used for subduing prey. This venom contains various peptides and is toxic to bacteria (e.g. methicillin resistant Staphylococcus aureus), fungi, other arthropods (e.g. aphids and Varroa mites), and mammalian cells.
