= Mesochelifer =

Scientific classification
- Domain: Eukaryota
- Kingdom: Animalia
- Phylum: Arthropoda
- Subphylum: Chelicerata
- Class: Arachnida
- Order: Pseudoscorpiones
- Family: Cheliferidae
- Genus: Mesochelifer; Vachon, 1940

Type species
- Mesochelifer fradei Vachon, 1940

Species
- 4, see text

Genus of pseudoscorpions

Mesochelifer is a genus of pseudoscorpions in the family Cheliferidae, first described by Max Vachon in 1940.

== Species ==
As of October 2023, the World Pseudoscorpiones Catalog accepts the following four species:

- Mesochelifer fradei Vachon, 1940
- Mesochelifer pardoi (Beier, 1956)
- Mesochelifer ressli Mahnert, 1981
- Mesochelifer thunebergi Kaisila, 1966
