= Australochelifer =

Scientific classification
- Kingdom: Animalia
- Phylum: Arthropoda
- Subphylum: Chelicerata
- Class: Arachnida
- Order: Pseudoscorpiones
- Family: Cheliferidae
- Genus: Australochelifer; Beier, 1975

Type species
- Australochelifer pygmaeus Beier, 1975

Genus of pseudoscorpions

Australochelifer is a monotypic genus of pseudoscorpions in the Cheliferidae family. It was described in 1975 by Austrian arachnologist Max Beier.

== Species ==
The genus contains the single species Australochelifer pygmaeus Beier, 1975.

=== Distribution and habitat ===
The species occurs in New South Wales. The type locality is near Waste Point on Mount Kosciuszko, where the pseudoscorpions were found in open forest plant litter.

=== Behaviour ===
The pseudoscorpions are terrestrial predators.
