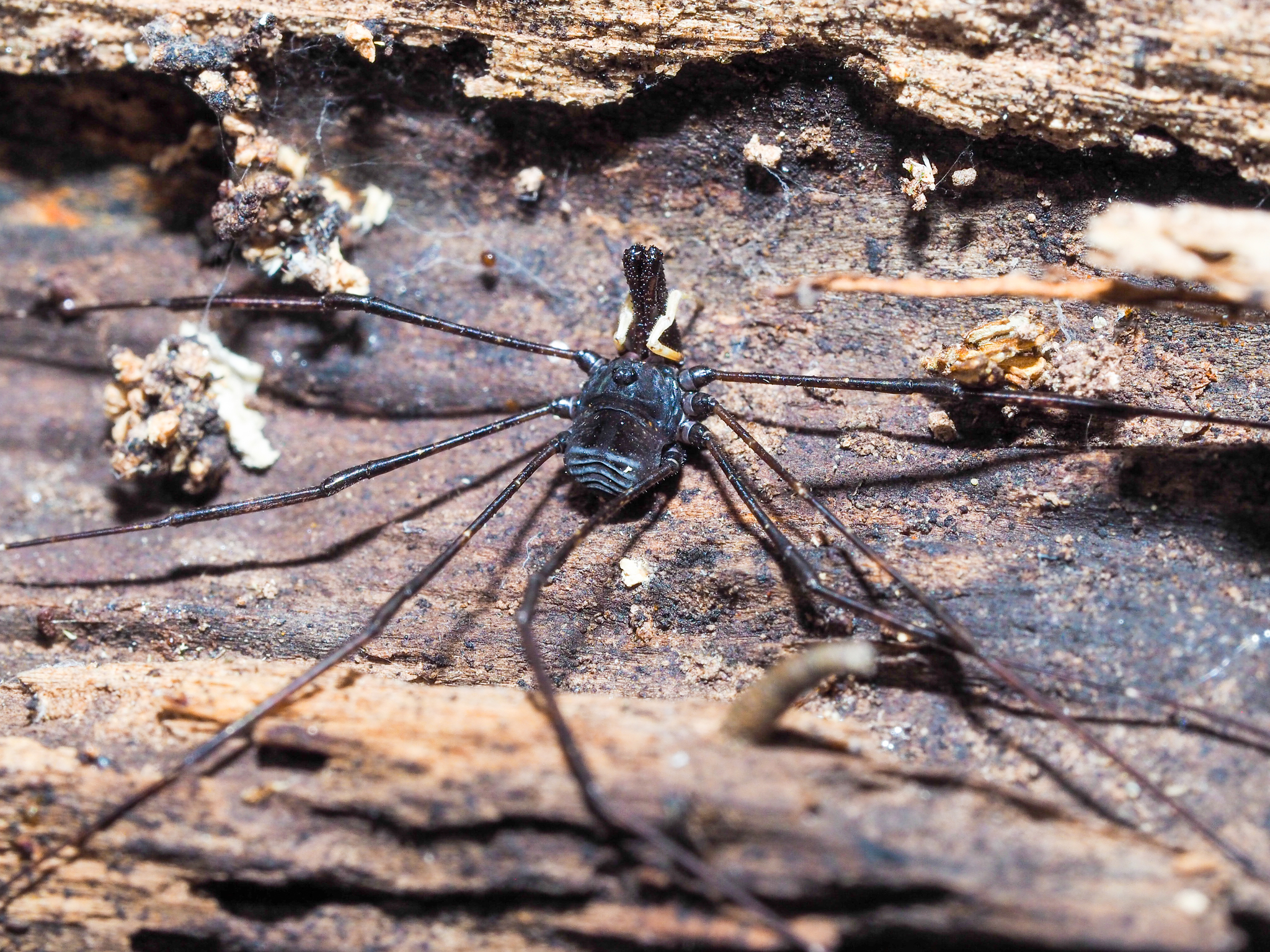

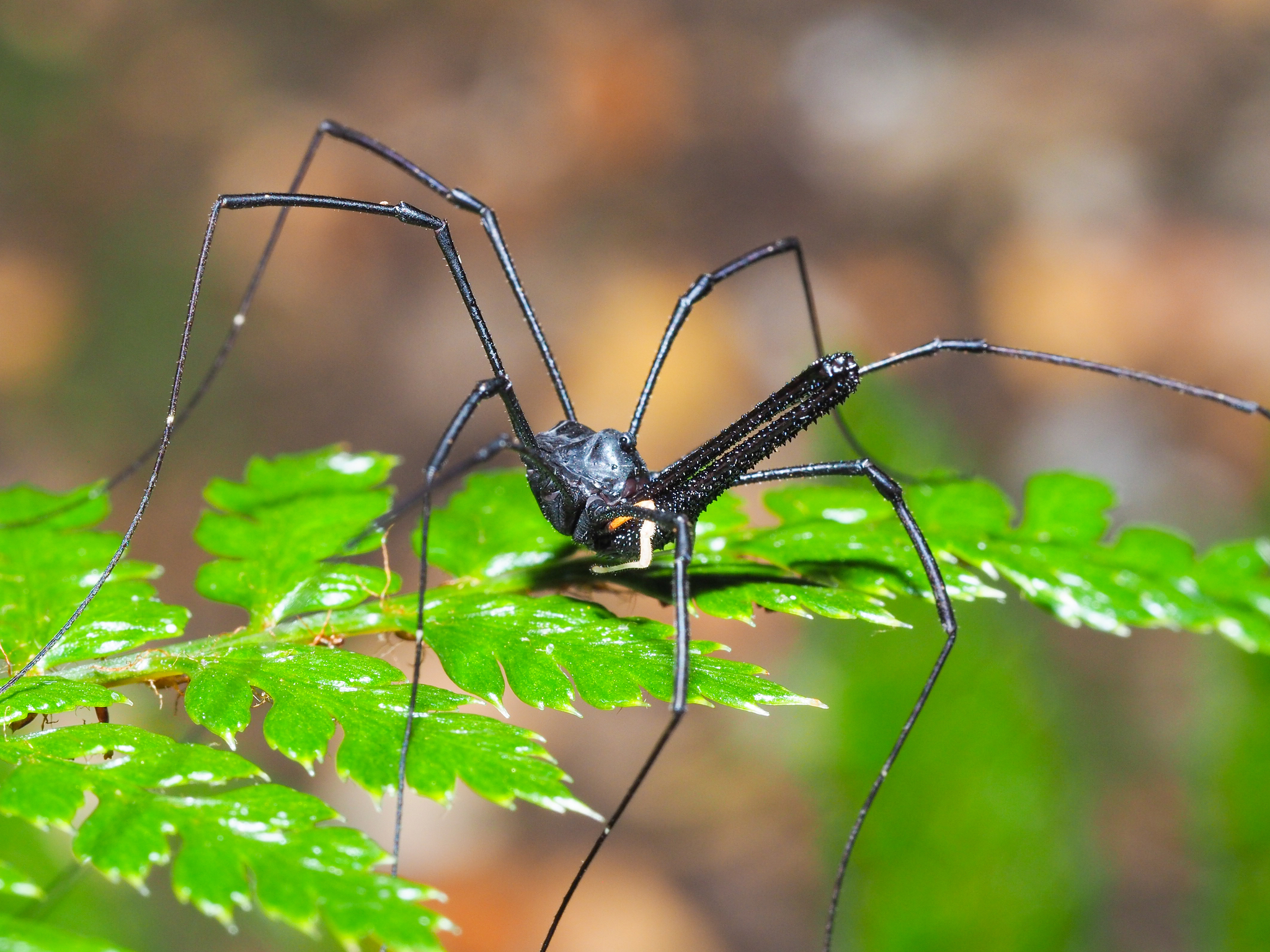

Scientific classification
- Domain: Eukaryota
- Kingdom: Animalia
- Phylum: Arthropoda
- Subphylum: Chelicerata
- Class: Arachnida
- Order: Opiliones
- Family: Neopilionidae
- Genus: Pantopsalis
- Species: P. listeri

Binomial name
- Pantopsalis listeri (White, 1849)

= Pantopsalis listeri =

Species of spider

Pantopsalis listeri is a species of harvestman in the family Neopilionidae.

== Description ==
A description of the genus revising that of Eugene Simon is given by Christopher Taylor. Like other species of Monoscutidae, P. listeri has paired bristle groups at the junction of the shaft and the glans of the penis.

== Taxonomy ==
Pantopsalis listeri was first described as Phalangium listeri by Scottish zoologist, Adam White in 1849. It was transferred to the genus, Pantopsalis, in 1879 by Eugène Simon.
