= Philomaoria =

Scientific classification
- Kingdom: Animalia
- Phylum: Arthropoda
- Subphylum: Chelicerata
- Class: Arachnida
- Order: Pseudoscorpiones
- Family: Cheliferidae
- Genus: Philomaoria; Chamberlin, 1931

Type species
- Philomaoria novazealandica Chamberlin, 1931

Genus of pseudoscorpions

Philomaoria is a genus of pseudoscorpions in the Cheliferidae family. It was described in 1931 by American arachnologist Joseph Conrad Chamberlin.

== Species ==
The genus contains the following species:

- Philomaoria hispida Beier, 1976
- Philomaoria pallipes (White, 1849)
