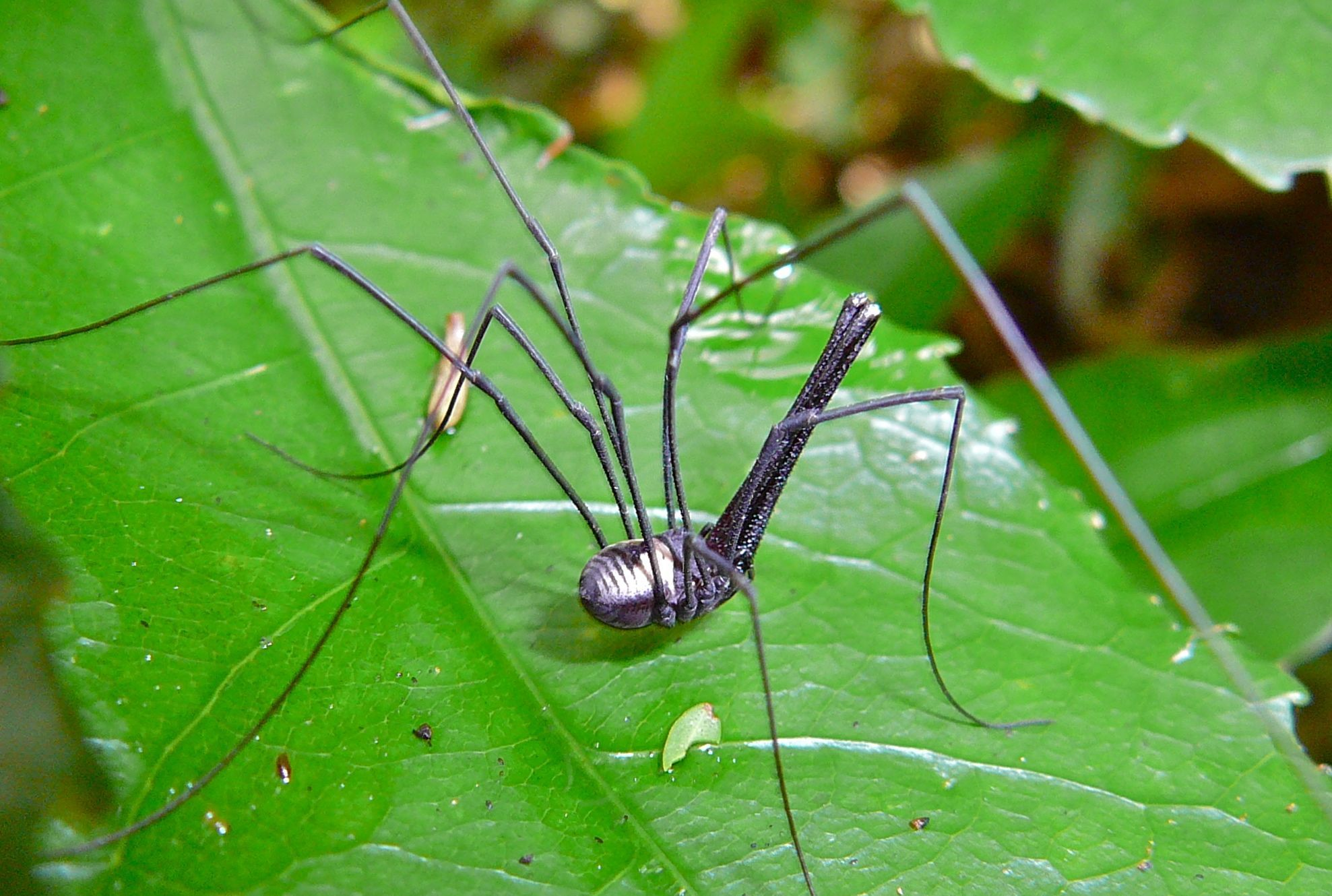

Scientific classification
- Kingdom: Animalia
- Phylum: Arthropoda
- Subphylum: Chelicerata
- Class: Arachnida
- Order: Opiliones
- Family: Neopilionidae
- Genus: Pantopsalis
- Species: P. coronata

Binomial name
- Pantopsalis coronata Pocock, 1903

= Pantopsalis coronata =

Species of spider

Pantopsalis coronata is a species from the genus Pantopsalis.

== Sources ==
- The Annals and magazine of natural history; zoology, botany, and geology. Vol. ser.7:v.11=no.61-66 (1903). Taylor and Francis, Ltd. 1903. p. 436.
- The Annals and magazine of natural history; zoology, botany, and geology. Vol. ser.7:v.11=no.61-66 (1903). Taylor and Francis, Ltd. 1903. p. 437.
- Archiv für Naturgeschichte. Vol. Jahrg.77:Bd.1 (1911). Nicolai. 1911. p. 102.
- Index faunæ Novæ Zealandiæ. Dulau & Co. 1904. p. 343.
- Index faunæ Novæ Zealandiæ. Dulau & Co., 37 Soho Square. 1904. p. 343.
- Proceedings of the Zoological Society of London. Vol. 1920:pt.1-4 [pp.1-656]. Academic Press, [etc.] 1920. p. 33.
- Proceedings of the Zoological Society of London. Vol. 1920:pt.1-4 [pp.1-656]. Academic Press, [etc.] 1920. p. 33.

Media related to Pantopsalis coronata at Wikimedia Commons
