= Pycnochelifer =

Scientific classification
- Domain: Eukaryota
- Kingdom: Animalia
- Phylum: Arthropoda
- Subphylum: Chelicerata
- Class: Arachnida
- Order: Pseudoscorpiones
- Family: Cheliferidae
- Genus: †Pycnochelifer; Beier, 1937

Extinct genus of spiders

Pycnochelifer is a fossil genus of arachnids belonging to the family Cheliferidae.

The species of this genus are found in Europe.

Species:

- Pycnochelifer kleemanni (C.L.Koch & Berendt, 1854)
