= Protochelifer =

Scientific classification
- Kingdom: Animalia
- Phylum: Arthropoda
- Subphylum: Chelicerata
- Class: Arachnida
- Order: Pseudoscorpiones
- Family: Cheliferidae
- Genus: Protochelifer; Beier, 1948

Type species
- Protochelifer novaezealandiae Beier, 1948

Genus of pseudoscorpions

Protochelifer is a genus of pseudoscorpions in the Cheliferidae family. It was described in 1948 by Austrian zoologist Max Beier.

== Species ==
The genus contains the following species:

- Protochelifer australis (Tubb, 1937)
- Protochelifer brevidigitatus (Tubb, 1937)
- Protochelifer cavernarum Beier, 1967
- Protochelifer exiguus Beier, 1976
- Protochelifer naracoortensis Beier, 1968
- Protochelifer novaezealandiae Beier, 1948
- Protochelifer victorianus Beier, 1966
