= Nannochelifer =

Scientific classification
- Kingdom: Animalia
- Phylum: Arthropoda
- Subphylum: Chelicerata
- Class: Arachnida
- Order: Pseudoscorpiones
- Family: Cheliferidae
- Genus: Nannochelifer; Beier, 1967

Type species
- Nannochelifer litoralis Beier, 1967

Genus of pseudoscorpions

Nannochelifer is a genus of pseudoscorpions in the Cheliferidae family. It was described in 1967 by Austrian arachnologist Max Beier.

== Species ==
The genus contains the following species:

- Nannochelifer litoralis Beier, 1967
- Nannochelifer paralius Harvey, 1984
