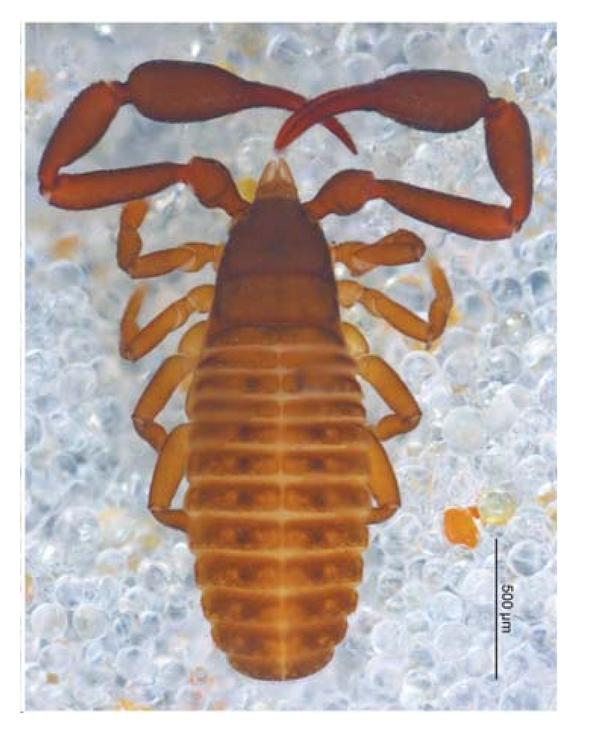
- Dactylochelifer luyaensis

Scientific classification
- Domain: Eukaryota
- Kingdom: Animalia
- Phylum: Arthropoda
- Subphylum: Chelicerata
- Class: Arachnida
- Order: Pseudoscorpiones
- Family: Cheliferidae
- Genus: Dactylochelifer; Beier, 1932

Type species
- Dactylochelifer latreillii (Leach, 1817)

Species
- 46, see text

= Dactylochelifer =

Genus of pseudoscorpions

Dactylochelifer is a genus of pseudoscorpions in the family Cheliferidae, first described by Max Beier in 1932.

== Species ==
As of October 2023, the World Pseudoscorpiones Catalog accepts the following forty-six species:

- Dactylochelifer amurensis (Tullgren, 1907)
- Dactylochelifer anatolicus Beier, 1963
- Dactylochelifer arabicus Mahnert, 1991
- Dactylochelifer balearicus Beier, 1961
- Dactylochelifer beieri Redikorzev, 1932
- Dactylochelifer besucheti Mahnert, 1978
- Dactylochelifer brachialis Beier, 1952
- Dactylochelifer copiosus Hoff, 1945
- Dactylochelifer dolichodactylus Caporiacco, 1939
- Dactylochelifer falsus (Beier, 1930)
- Dactylochelifer gansuensis Redikorzev, 1934
- Dactylochelifer gobiensis Beier, 1969
- Dactylochelifer gracilis Beier, 1951
- Dactylochelifer gruberi Beier, 1969
- Dactylochelifer infuscatus Beier, 1967
- Dactylochelifer intermedius Redikorzev, 1949
- Dactylochelifer kaszabi Beier, 1970
- Dactylochelifer kerzhneri Beier, 1973
- Dactylochelifer kussariensis (Daday, 1889)
- Dactylochelifer ladakhensis Beier, 1978
- Dactylochelifer latreillii (Leach, 1817)
- Dactylochelifer lindbergi Beier, 1959
- Dactylochelifer lobatschevi Krumpál & Kiefer, 1982
- Dactylochelifer luyaensis Gao & Zhang, 2012
- Dactylochelifer marlausicola Dumitresco & Orghidan, 1969
- Dactylochelifer maroccanus (Beier, 1930)
- Dactylochelifer martensi Dashdamirov, 2006
- Dactylochelifer minor Dashdamirov & Schawaller, 1995
- Dactylochelifer mongolicola Beier, 1970
- Dactylochelifer monticola Beier, 1960
- Dactylochelifer mrciaki Krumpál, 1984
- Dactylochelifer nubicus Beier, 1962
- Dactylochelifer pallidus Beier, 1963
- Dactylochelifer popovi Redikorzev, 1949
- Dactylochelifer redikorzevi (Beier, 1929)
- Dactylochelifer ressli Beier, 1967
- Dactylochelifer saharensis Heurtault, 1971
- Dactylochelifer scaurus Mahnert, 1978
- Dactylochelifer scheuerni Schawaller, 1987
- Dactylochelifer shinkaii Sato, 1982
- Dactylochelifer silvestris Hoff, 1956
- Dactylochelifer somalicus Caporiacco, 1937
- Dactylochelifer spasskyi Redikorzev, 1949
- Dactylochelifer syriacus Beier, 1955
- Dactylochelifer vtorovi Mahnert, 1977
- Dactylochelifer zaragozai Nassirkhani, 2022
