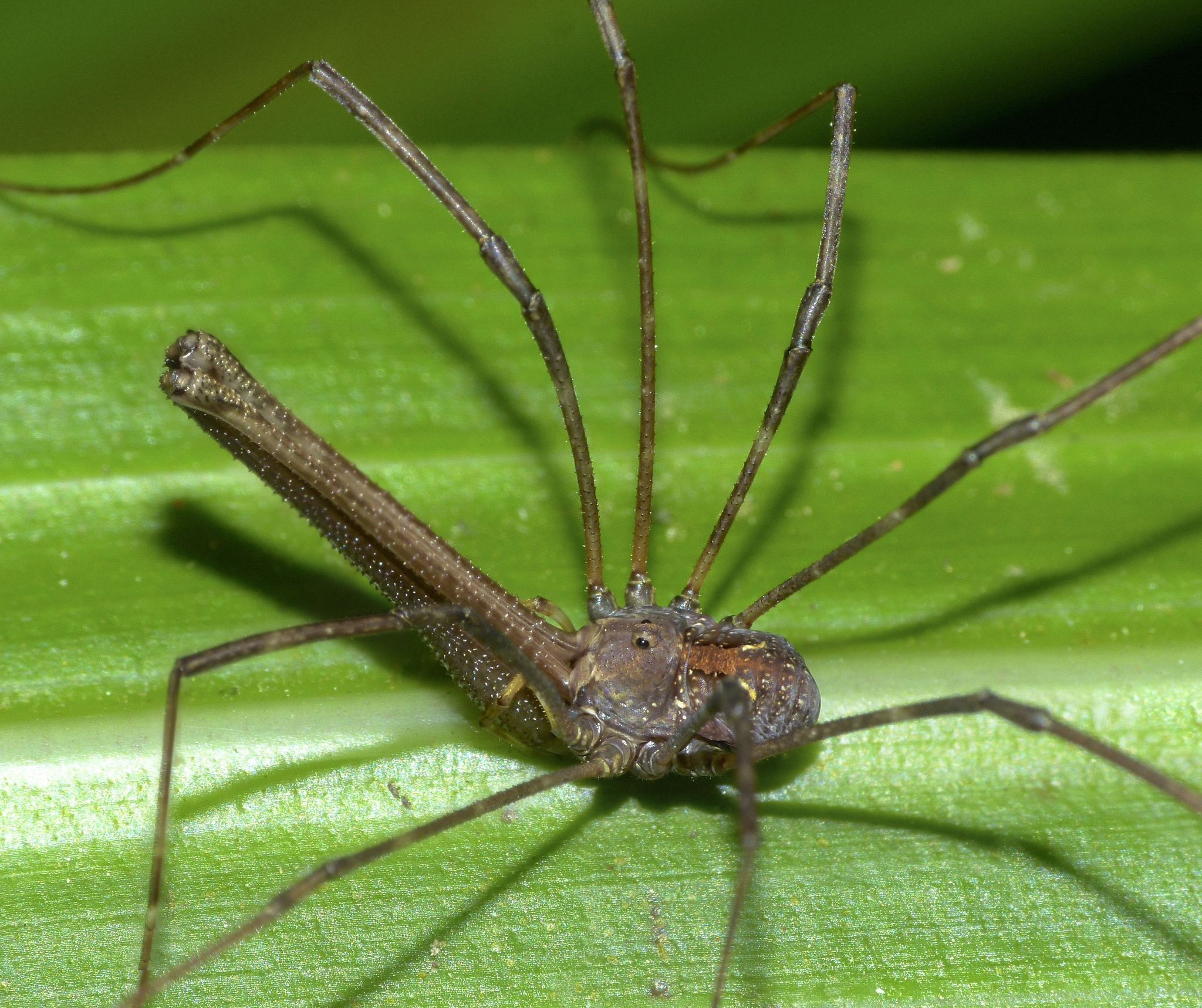

Scientific classification
- Kingdom: Animalia
- Phylum: Arthropoda
- Subphylum: Chelicerata
- Class: Arachnida
- Order: Opiliones
- Family: Neopilionidae
- Genus: Pantopsalis
- Species: P. albipalpis

Binomial name
- Pantopsalis albipalpis Pocock, 1902

= Pantopsalis albipalpis =

Species of spider

Pantopsalis albipalpis is a species of harvestman in the genus Pantopsalis. It was first described by Reginald Innes Pocock in a paper published in 1902. P. albipalpis cannot be distinguished from P. johnsi but P. johnsi has not been synonymised as these species each have a distinct distribution. The species is known for its long three-segmented chelicerae.
