= Chelicerae =

Mouthparts of spiders and horseshoe crabs

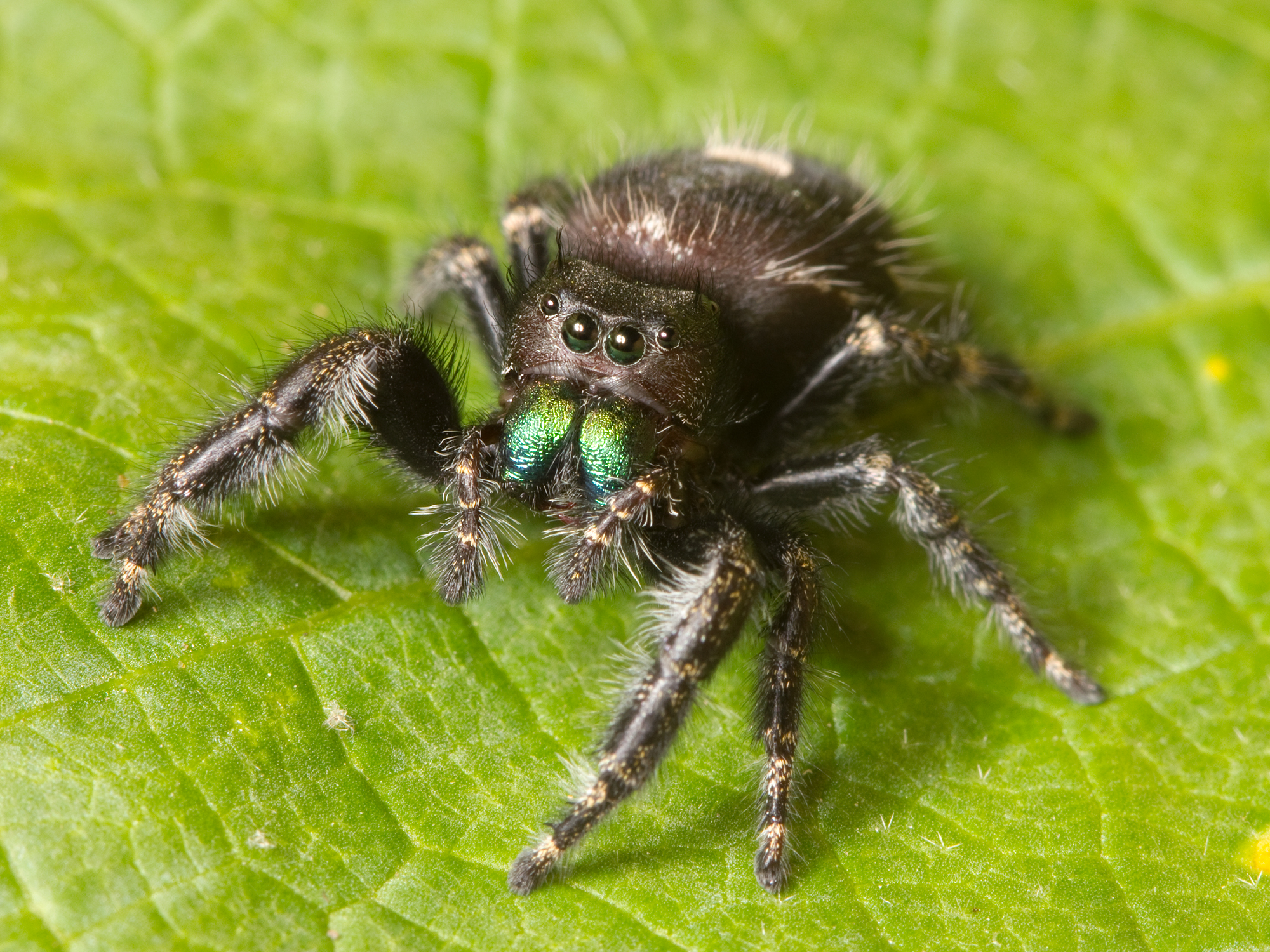
The jumping spider Phidippus audax. The basal parts of the chelicerae are the two iridescent green mouthparts.

A joro spider using it's chelicerae to eat prey in Japan

The chelicerae (/kəˈlɪsəriː/) are the mouthparts of the subphylum Chelicerata, an arthropod group that includes arachnids, horseshoe crabs, and sea spiders. Commonly referred to as "jaws", chelicerae may be shaped as either articulated fangs, or as a type of pincers. Some chelicerae, such as those found on nearly all spiders, are hollow and contain (or are connected to) venom glands, used to inject venom into prey or a perceived threat. Both pseudoscorpions and harvestmen—neither of which have that venom channel—have additional structures on their chelicerae that are used for grooming (papillae in pseudoscorpions, cheliceral teeth in Opiliones). In many spider species, males and females have sexually dimorphic chelicerae.

== Types ==
Types of chelicerae: (A) jackknife, (B) scissor, (C) three-segmented chelate

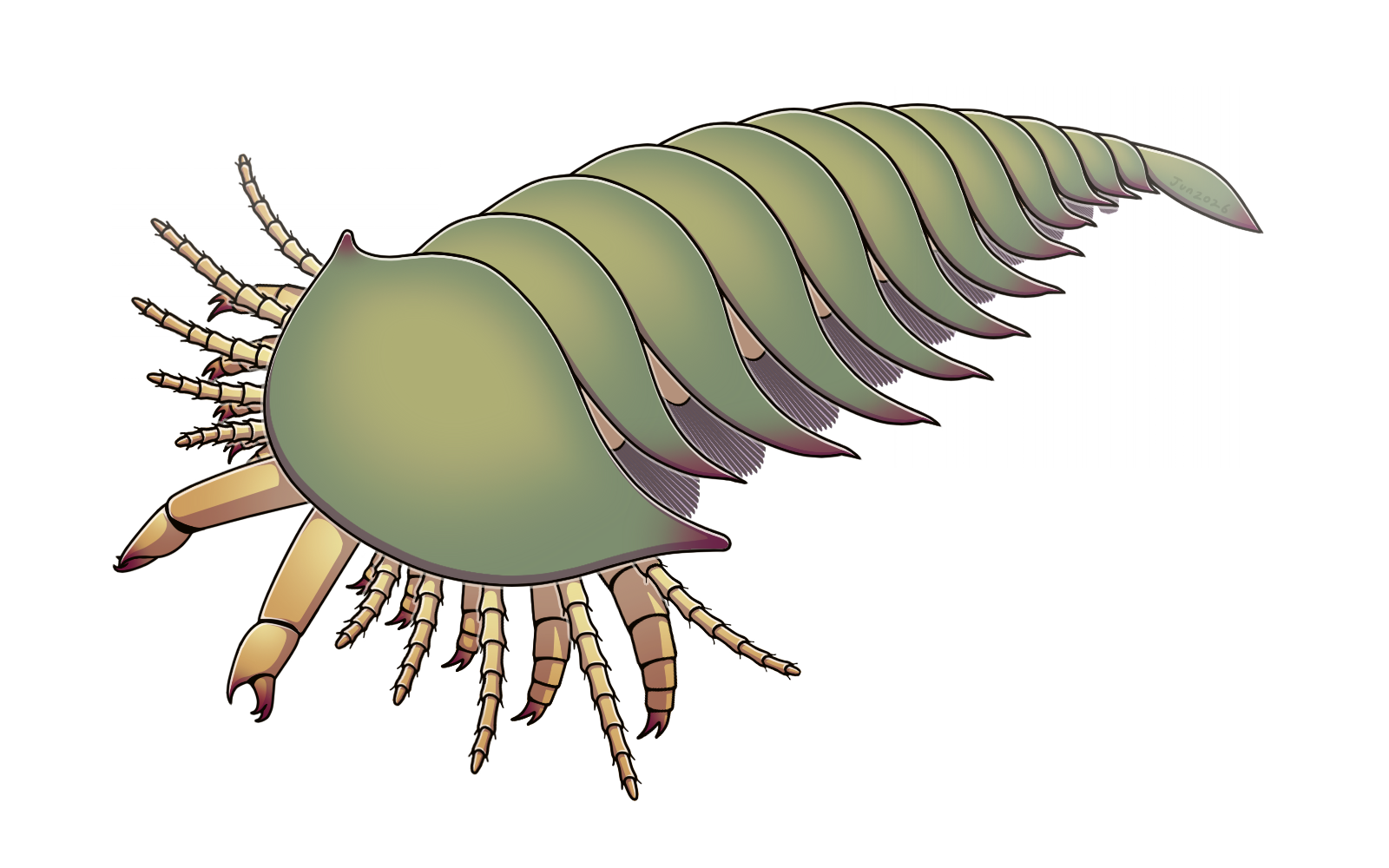
Life restoration of the Cambrian Megachelicerax, the oldest known chelicerate-bearing arthropod, which has 3-segmented chelicerae

Chelicerae can be divided into three kinds: jackknife chelicerae, scissor chelicerae, and three-segmented chelate (pincer-like) chelicerae. The earliest known chelicerae-bearing arthropod, the Cambrian Megachelicerax, has three-segmented chelicerae, suggesting that this type is probably ancestral among chelicerates.

=== Jackknife chelicerae ===
The jackknife chelicera is subchelate (with fixed finger much reduced or absent) and is composed of two segments. This type of chelicera occurs exclusively in the Tetrapulmonata.

Jackknife chelicera are described in two different forms: orthognathous and labidognathous. Orthognathous chelicerae are articulated in a manner that enables movements of the appendages parallel to the body axis. This kind of chelicera occurs in the Liphistiomorphae and Mygalomorphae spiders and in the related orders Amblypygi, Schizomida and Uropygi. Labidognathous chelicerae move at right angles to the body axis. This kind of chelicera is rotated and occurs exclusively in the Araneomorphae spiders.

==== Spider chelicerae ====
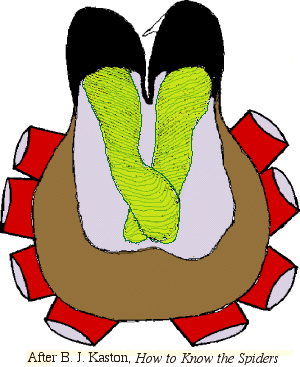
Spider chelicerae. The chelicerae are shown in black, the surface of the cephalothorax in brown, the legs in reddish brown, and the venom glands and surrounding muscle tissue in green. The fang portion of the right chelicera can be seen projecting into the space between the two chelicerae.

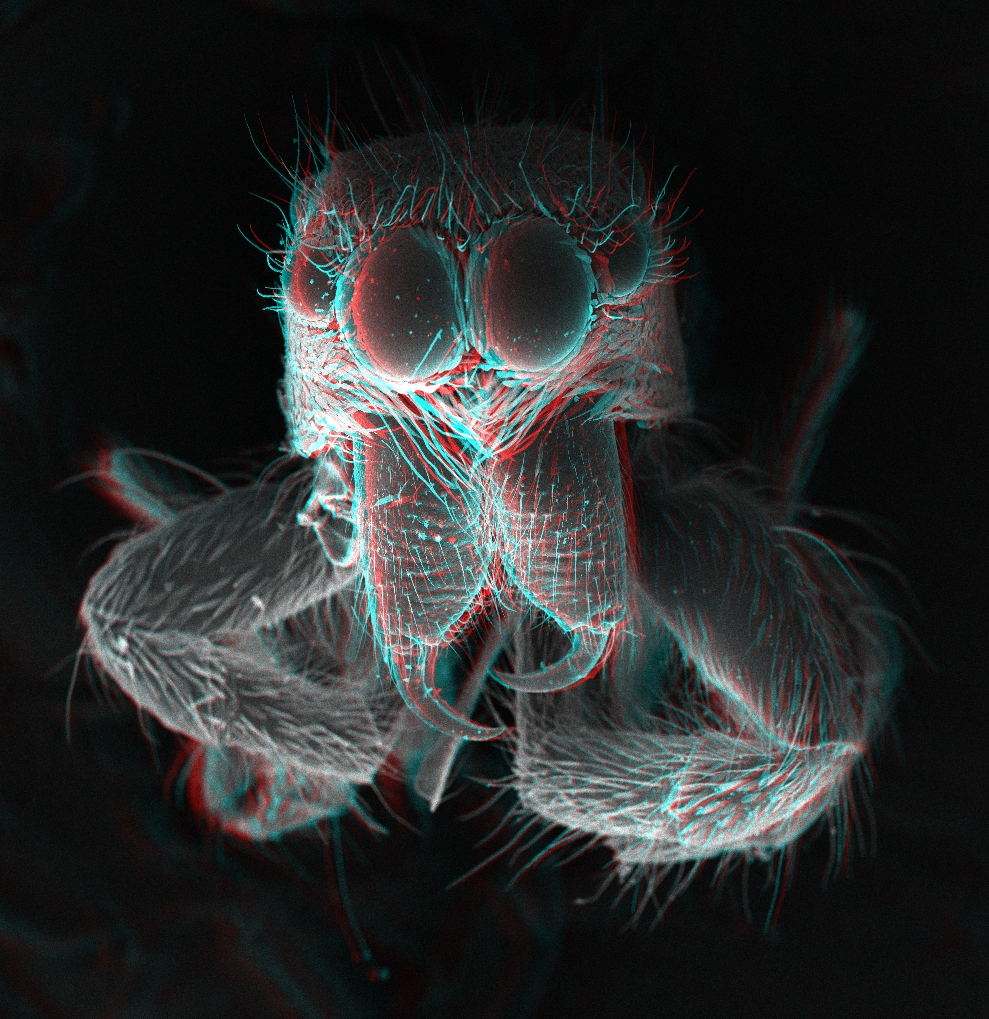
3D view of the chelicerae of a jumping spider. The pedipalps were removed to see the chelicerae.

The chelicerae consist of a base segment, sometimes called the "paturon", that articulates with the cephalothorax (or prosoma) and a fang portion that articulates with the base segment. Almost all spiders have venom glands and can inject the venom through openings near the tips of their fangs when biting prey. The glands that produce this venom are located in the two segments of the chelicerae, and, in most spiders, extend beyond the chelicerae and into the cephalothorax. The fang, the organic functional equivalent to a hypodermic needle, is what penetrates the skin, fur, or exoskeleton of the spider's target. In most species spider mouthparts are primarily intended for envenoming a spider's prey, typically insects and other small arthropods. The basal portion includes all or part of the spider's venom glands, which can be squeezed to control the amount of venom forced out of the glands. Such control permits a spider to administer either a dry bite, a dose appropriate to the nature of the prey or enemy, or a maximal dose. The control is also necessary for actions such as the spitting of venomous silk by members of the family Scytodidae; they depend on that mechanism both in hunting and defence.

Chelicerae of Psalmopoeus cambridgei

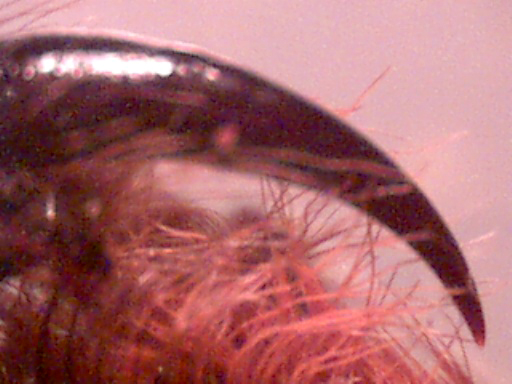
The fang is about 2 mm long. The spider itself is about 25 mm long.

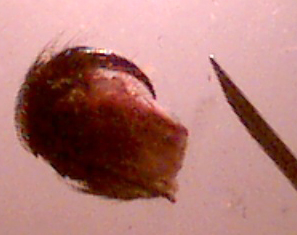
Microphotograph of the same chelicera and the tip of a 22–gauge (0.64 mm or 0.025 in) hypodermic needle

When a spider bites, the two parts of the chelicerae come together like a folding knife, and when making a threat display or actually preparing to bite, the spider will open the angle of the fangs with the basal portion of the chelicerae and also open the angle of the basal portion with the cephalothorax. In the tarantulas and other Mygalomorphae, the horizontal separation of the tips of the fangs does not change much, but in the other spiders the tips of the fangs move apart from each other as well as elevating. Even the tips of the fangs of the rather large spider shown above are quite sharp, and the spider's body is well adapted to driving the fangs into flesh. Some spider bites, such as those of the Sydney funnel-web spider, are reported to have penetrated toenails and soft leather shoes.

=== Uncate chelicerae ===
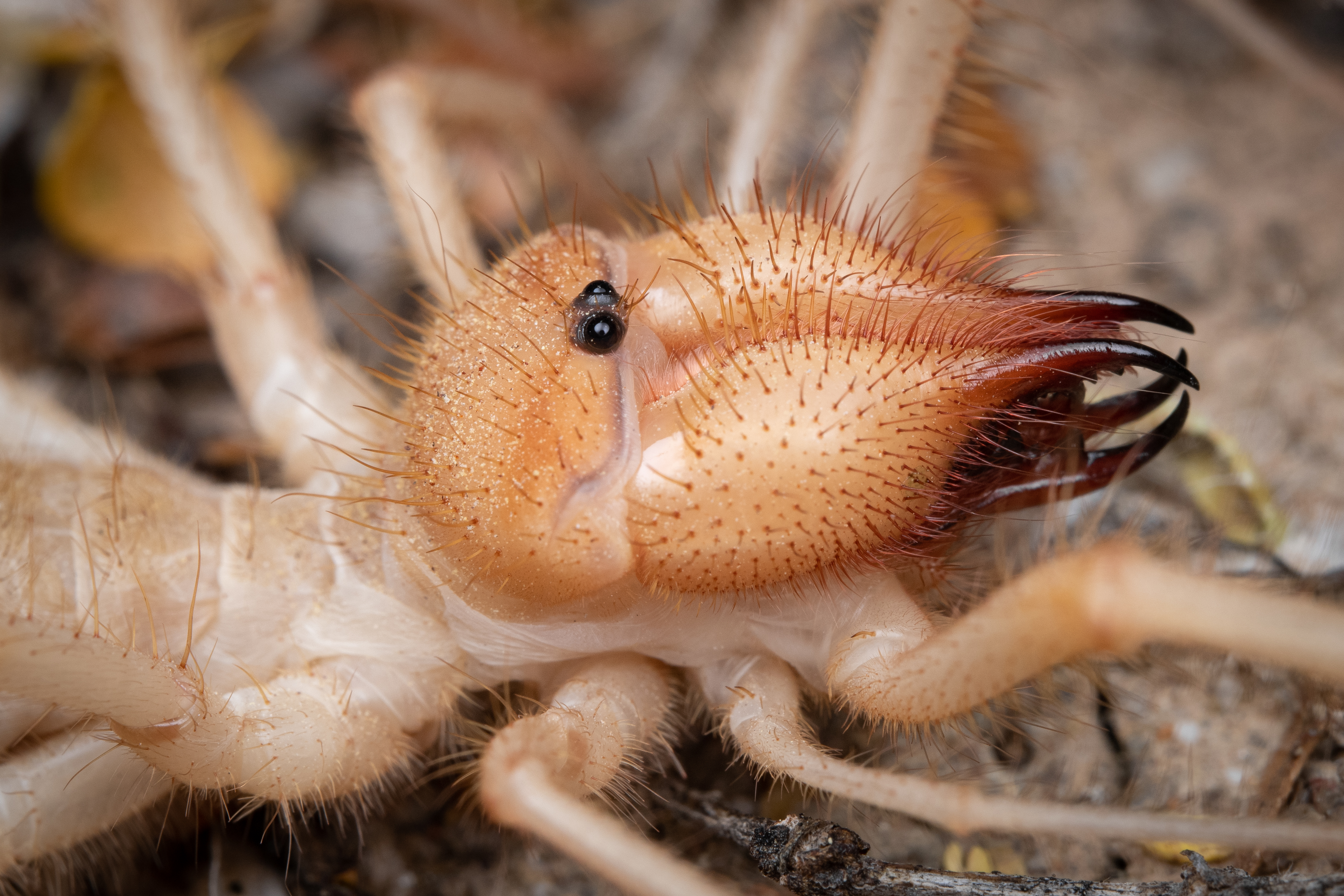
Uncate chelicerae of a solifuge

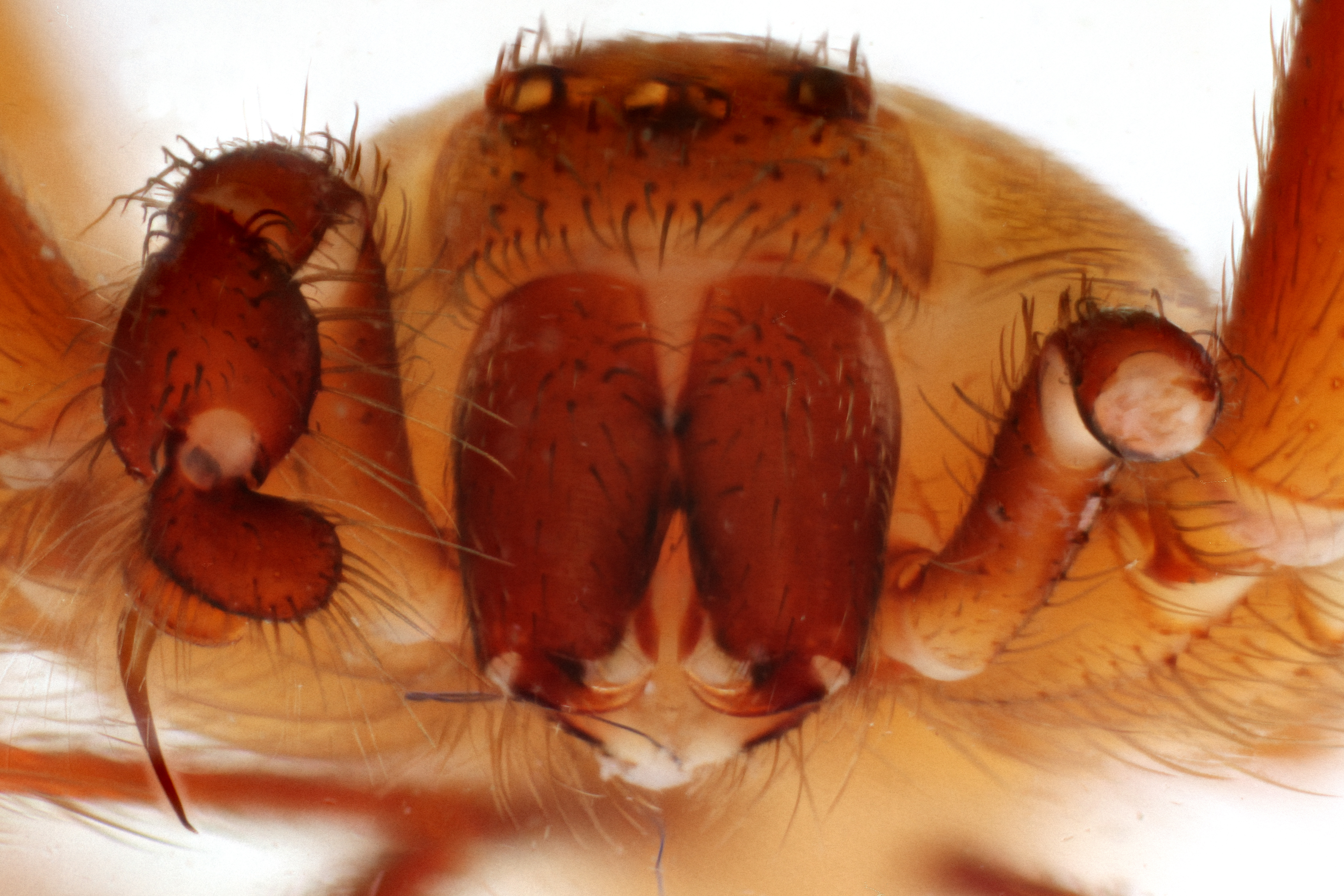
Front view of a brown recluse spider, showing its chelicerae

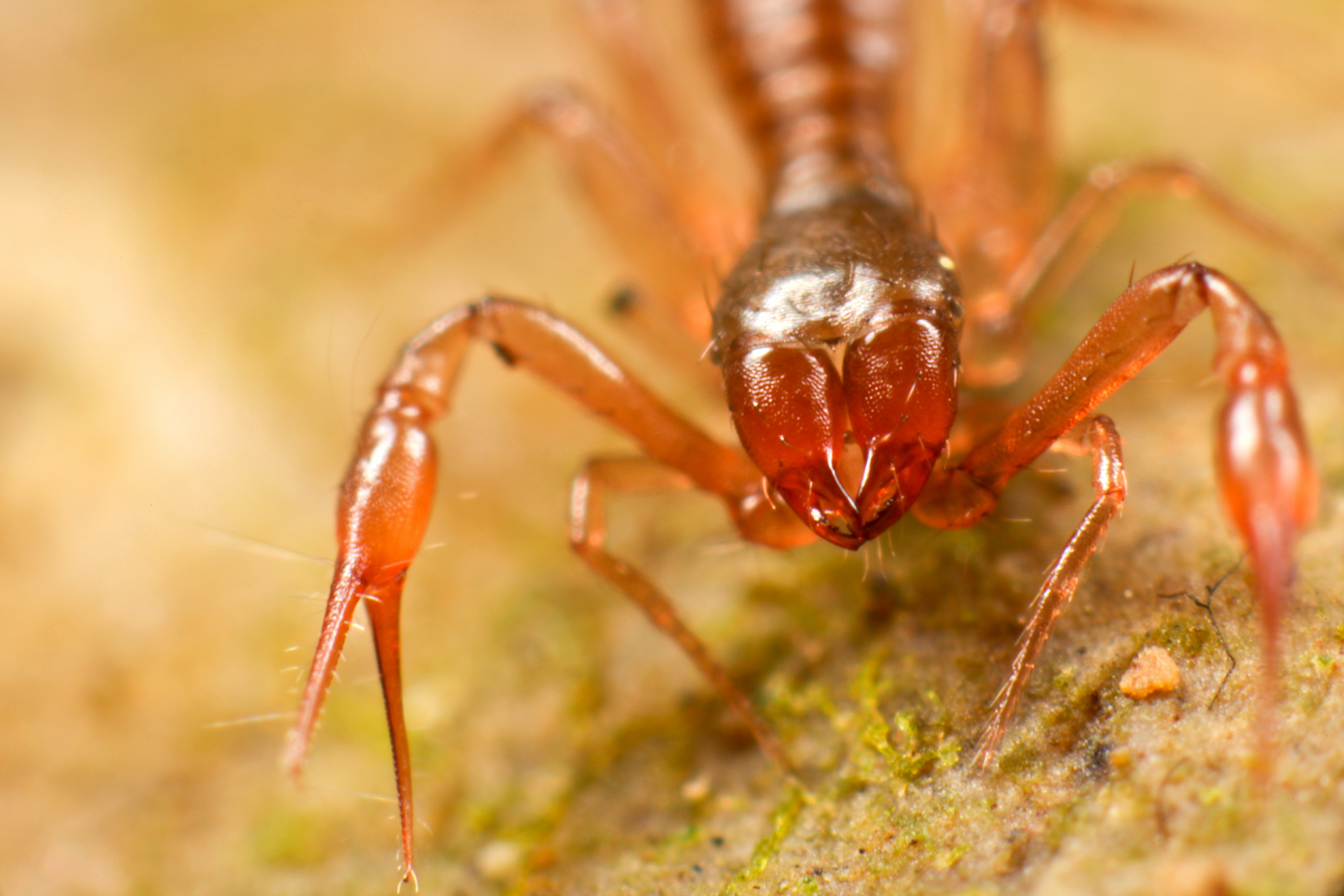
Uncate chelicerae of a pseudoscorpion

The uncate chelicera is chelate and composed of two segments and occurs in the orders Pseudoscorpiones, Solifugae, Ricinulei, and Araneae (e.g., brown recluse, cellar spider, and crevice weaving spider).

=== Three-segmented chelate chelicerae ===
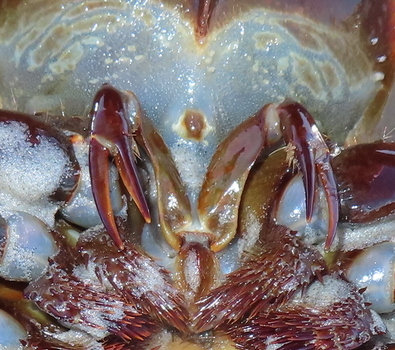
Three-segmented chelicerae of an Atlantic horseshoe crab

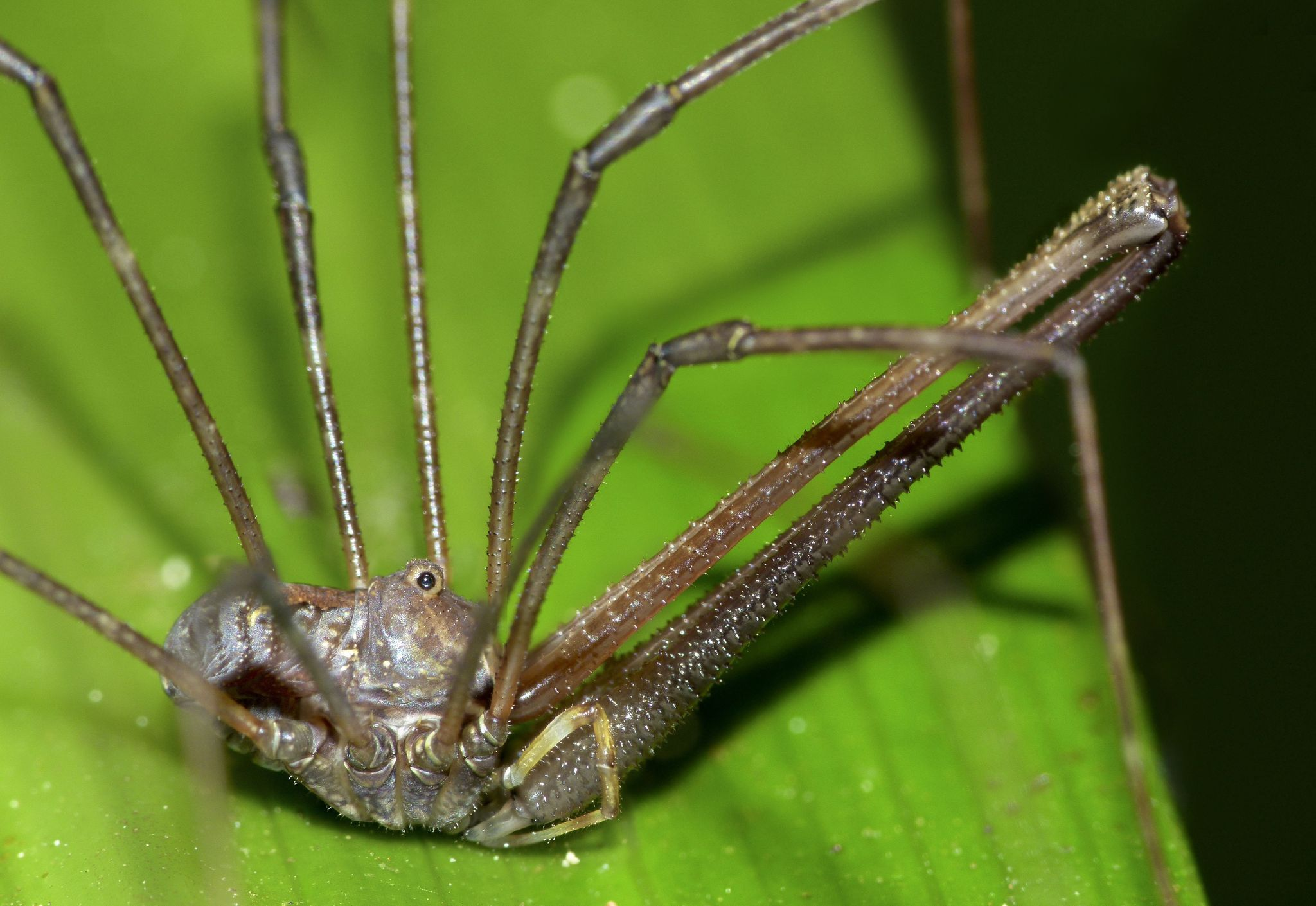
Pantopsalis albipalpis, a species of harvestman with exceptionally long three-segmented chelicerae

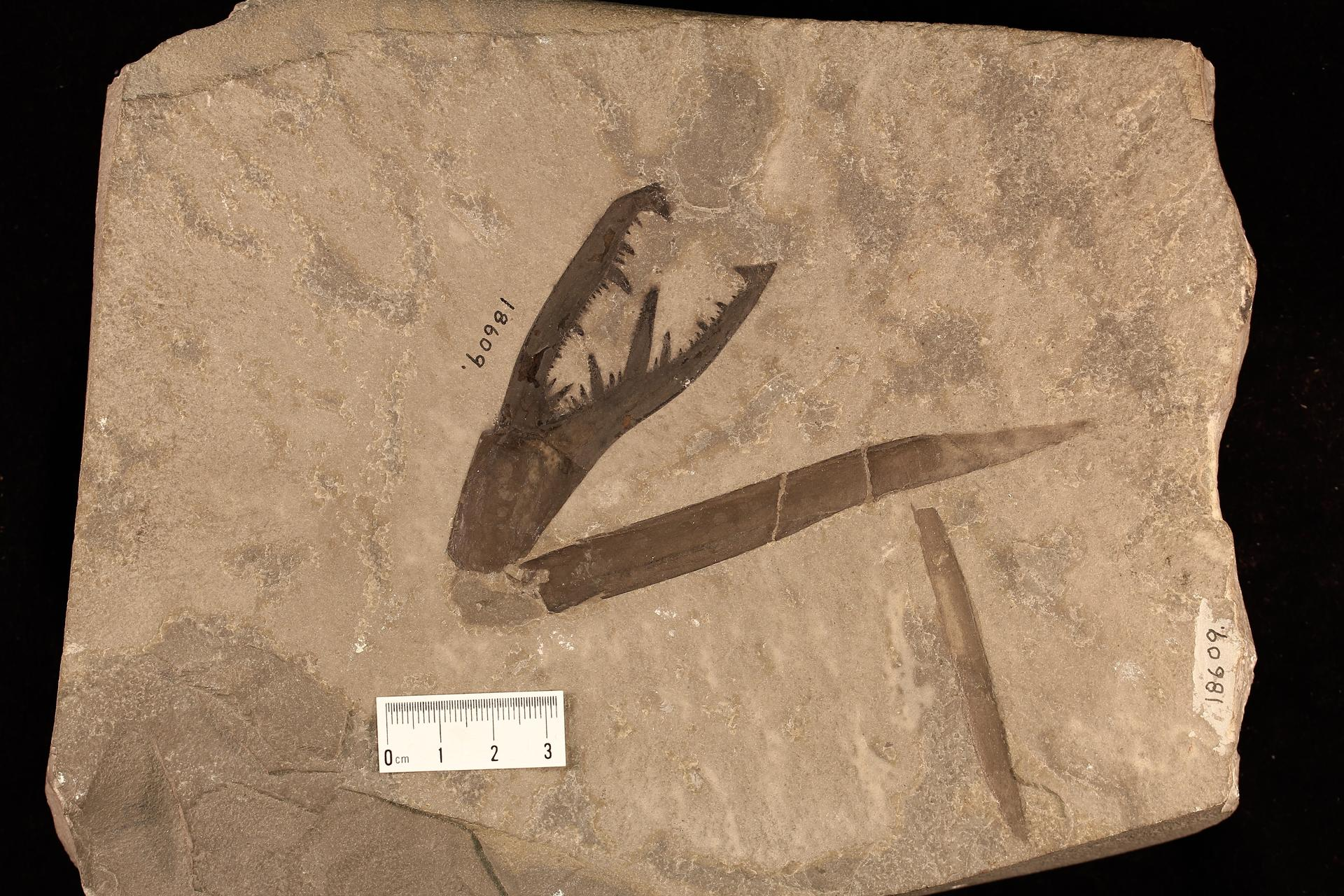
Isolated fossil chelicera of a pterygotid eurypterid, Acutiramus cummingsi

Having three-segmented chelate chelicerae is the primitive condition and occurs in arachnids such as the Scorpiones and the Opiliones, as well as in non-arachnid Chelicerata such as the Xiphosura and Eurypterida. The chelifores of the Pycnogonida may be homologous to chelicerae.
