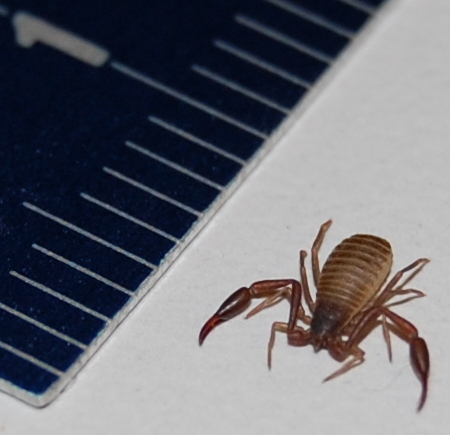
- Chelifer cancroides, the house pseudoscorpion

Scientific classification
- Domain: Eukaryota
- Kingdom: Animalia
- Phylum: Arthropoda
- Subphylum: Chelicerata
- Class: Arachnida
- Order: Pseudoscorpiones
- Superfamily: Cheliferoidea
- Family: Cheliferidae; Risso, 1827

= Cheliferidae =

Cheliferidae Temporal range: Cretaceous–present

Family of pseudoscorpions

Cheliferidae is a family of pseudoscorpions in the order Pseudoscorpiones, first described by Antoine Risso in 1827.

== Genera ==
As of October 2023, the World Pseudoscorpiones Catalog accepts the following sixty-four genera:

- Amaurochelifer Beier, 1951
- Ancistrochelifer Beier, 1951
- Aperittochelifer Beier, 1955
- Aporochelifer Beier, 1953
- Aspurochelifer Benedict and Malcolm, 1979
- Australochelifer Beier, 1975
- Beierius J. C. Chamberlin, 1932
- Beierochelifer Mahnert, 1977
- Canarichelifer Beier, 1965
- Centrochelifer Beier, 1959
- Chamberlinarius Heurtault, 1990
- Cheirochelifer Beier, 1967
- Chelifer Geoffroy, 1762
- Cubachelifer Hoff, 1946
- Dactylochelifer Beier, 1932
- Ellingsenius J. C. Chamberlin, 1932
- Eremochernes Beier, 1932
- Florichelifer Hoff, 1964
- Gobichelifer Krumpál, 1979
- Hansenius J. C. Chamberlin, 1932
- Haplochelifer J. C. Chamberlin, 1932
- Hygrochelifer Murthy and Ananthakrishnan, 1977
- Hysterochelifer J. C. Chamberlin, 1932
- Idiochelifer J. C. Chamberlin, 1932
- Kashimachelifer Morikawa, 1957
- Levichelifer Hoff, 1946
- Lissochelifer J. C. Chamberlin, 1932
- Litochelifer Beier, 1948
- Lophochernes E. Simon, 1878
- Lophodactylus J. C. Chamberlin, 1932
- Macrochelifer Vachon, 1940
- Mesochelifer Vachon, 1940
- Metachelifer Redikorzev, 1938
- Mexichelifer Muchmore, 1973
- Microchelifer Beier, 1944
- Mucrochelifer Beier, 1932
- Nannochelifer Beier, 1967
- Nannocheliferoides Beier, 1974
- Pachychelifer Beier, 1962
- Paisochelifer Hoff, 1946
- Papuchelifer Beier, 1965
- Parachelifer J. C. Chamberlin, 1932
- Philomaoria J. C. Chamberlin, 1931
- Phorochelifer Hoff, 1956
- Pilochelifer Beier, 1935
- Protochelifer Beier, 1948
- Pseudorhacochelifer Beier, 1976
- Pugnochelifer Hoff, 1964
- Rhacochelifer Beier, 1932
- Rhopalochelifer Beier, 1964
- Sinochelifer Beier, 1967
- Sociochelifer Harvey, 2015
- Stenochelifer Beier, 1967
- Strobilochelifer Beier, 1932
- Stygiochelifer Beier, 1932
- Telechelifer J. C. Chamberlin, 1949
- Tetrachelifer Beier, 1967
- Tyrannochelifer J. C. Chamberlin, 1932
- Xenochelifer J. C. Chamberlin, 1949
- †Dichela Menge, 1854
- †Electrochelifer Beier, 1937
- †Heurtaultia Judson, 2009
- †Pycnochelifer Judson, 2009
- †Trachychelifer Hong, 1983
