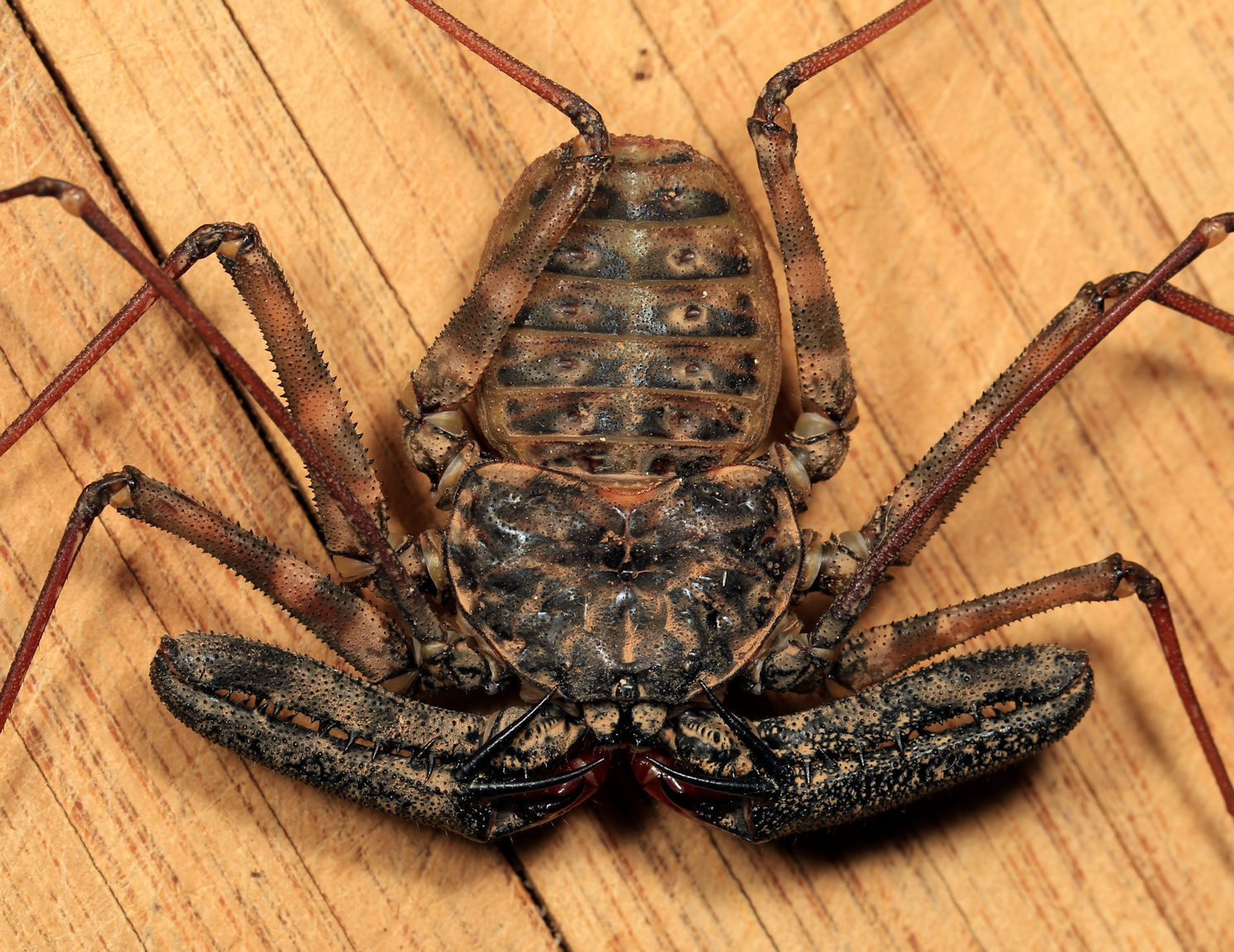
- Damon

Scientific classification
- Kingdom: Animalia
- Phylum: Arthropoda
- Subphylum: Chelicerata
- Class: Arachnida
- Order: Amblypygi
- Suborder: Euamblypygi
- Superfamily: Phrynoidea; Blanchard, 1852

Family
- Phrynidae; Phrynichidae

= Phrynoidea =

Superfamily of arachnids

Phrynoidea is a superfamily of whipspiders, containing two families, the Phrynidae and Phrynichidae.

== Description ==
Phrynoid amblypygi lack pulvilli on the ends of their walking legs, making them unable to climb glass or similar smooth surfaces. Phrynoidea contains some of the largest amblypygi, such as some members of the genera Heterophrynus, Acanthophrynus, Damon, and Euphrynichus.

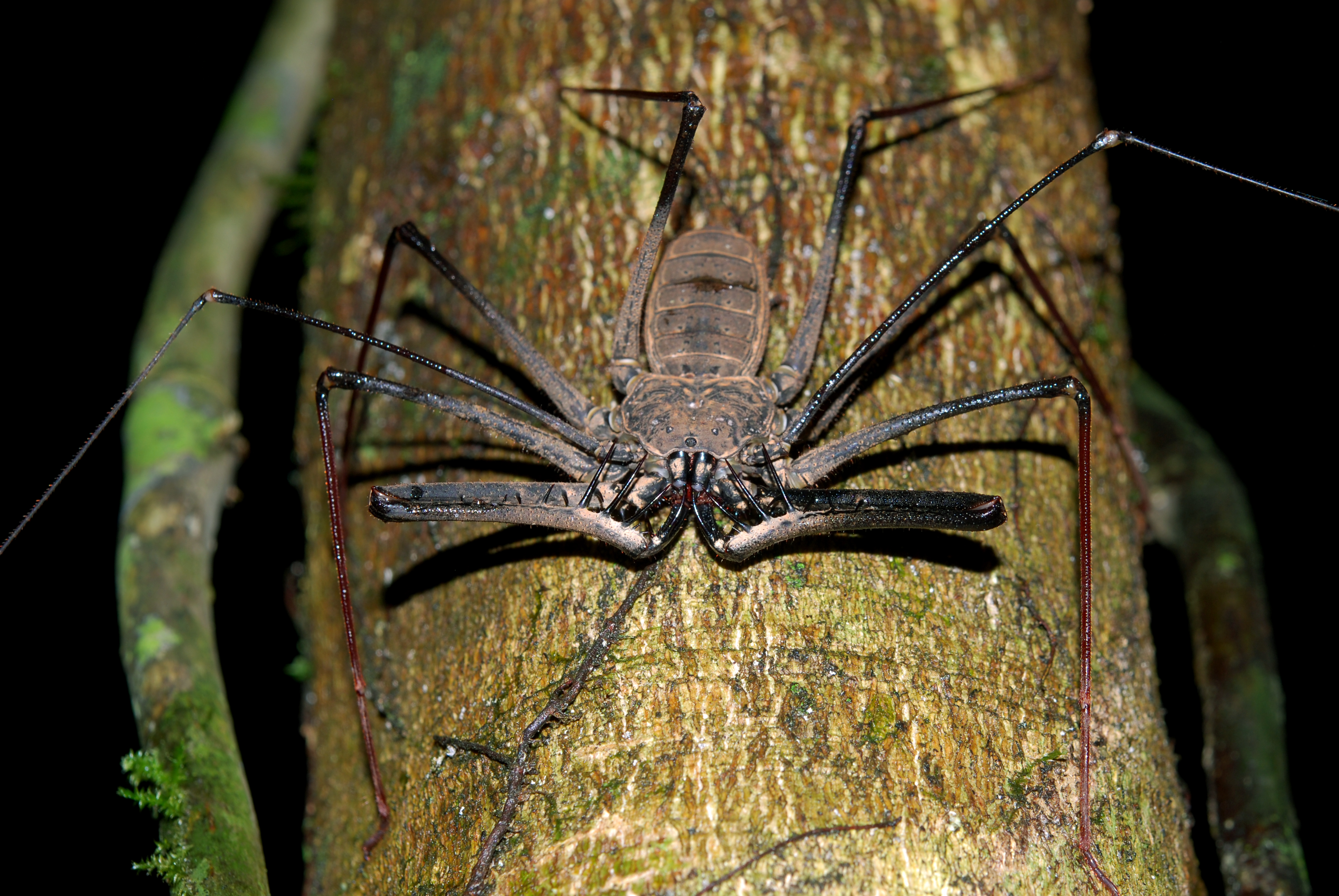
Heterophrynus, a Phrynid, Ecuador

Damon, a Phrynichid, South Africa

== Taxonomy ==
Phrynoidea is one of two superfamilies within the suborder Euamblypygi, the other being the monotypic Charontoidea.
