= Phrynichus scaber =

Scientific classification
- Kingdom: Animalia
- Phylum: Arthropoda
- Subphylum: Chelicerata
- Class: Arachnida
- Order: Amblypygi
- Family: Phrynichidae
- Genus: Phrynichus
- Species: P. scaber

Binomial name
- Phrynichus scaber Gervais, 1844

Species of arachnid

Phrynichus scaber is a species of whipspider (order Amblypygi) from the Seychelles and Mauritius.

== Description ==
Amblypygid researcher Peter Weygoldt referred to Phrynichus scaber as a "large and spectacular" amblypygid with "particularly impressive" mating behavior in his book Whipspiders: Their Biology, Morphology and Systematics. In common with other species in its genus, P. scaber has elongated pedipalps with few spines aside from the distal part of the tibia and the tarsus.

== Behavior ==
Phrynichus scaber is known for its elaborate and lengthy mating behavior. Weygoldt included a detailed description of this behavior in his 2000 book. In short, upon encountering one another, males and females exchange movements of their antenniform legs. The male unfolds his pedipalps while doing so, moving slowly except occasional rapid up-and-down jerks of his body. The male approaches, trembling his antenniform legs, and slowly brushes the female's pedipalps with his, continuing to jerk up and down occasionally. The male sometimes pulls the female to another location by grasping one or both of her pedipalps. The pedipalp stroking, antenniform leg tapping, and body jerking continue, until eventually turning to face the same direction as the female and shifting all or part of his body underneath the female. He then repeats this series of courtship several times at faster intervals, before finally depositing a spermatophore beneath the female. He returns to face the female and uses his pedipalps to press her down onto the spermatophore. Upon the female taking up the spermatophore the male quickly retreats.

== Distribution and habitat ==
Phrynichus scaber is found only in the Seychelles, which is the type locality, and on Mauritius.
