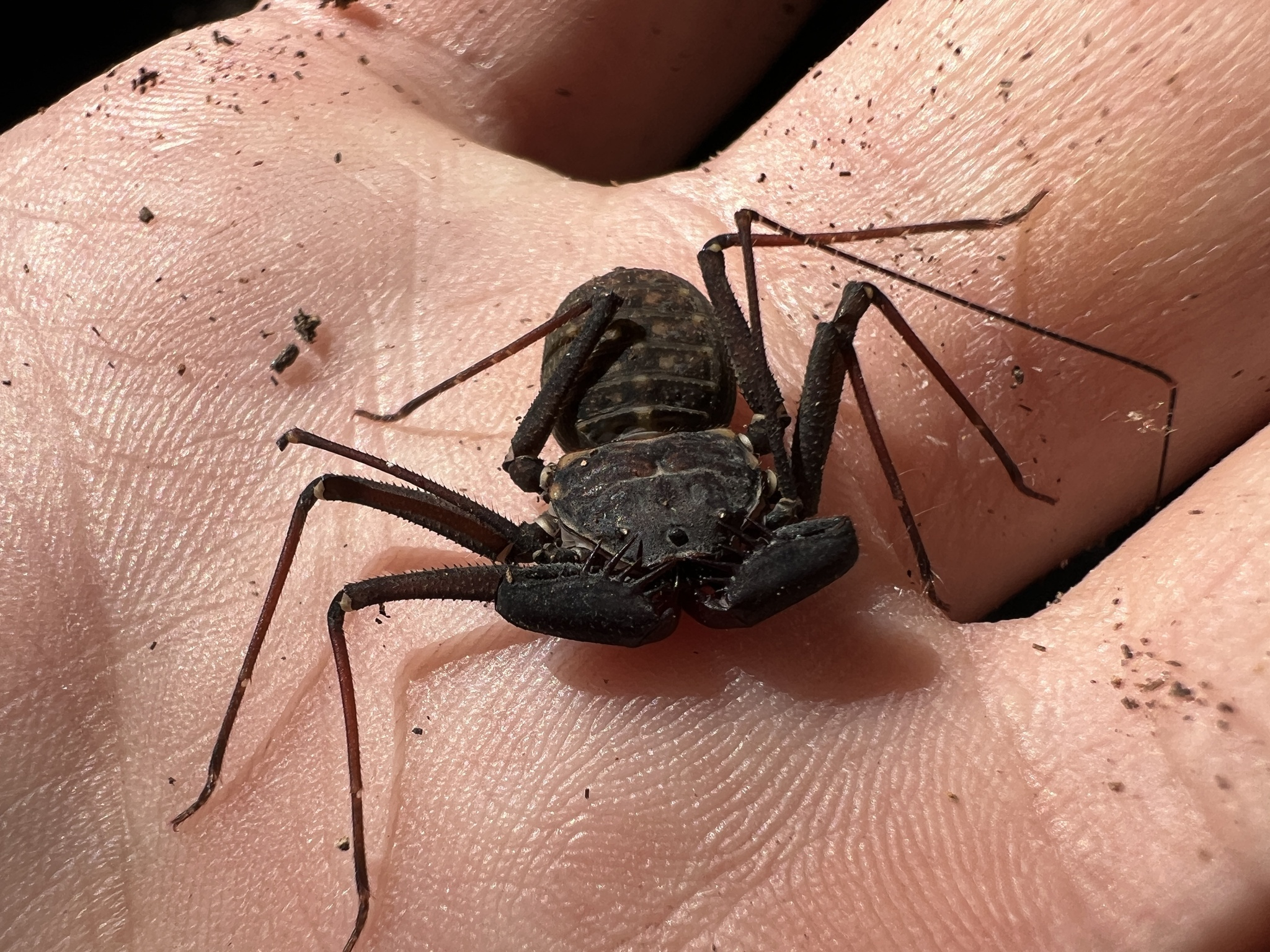

Scientific classification
- Kingdom: Animalia
- Phylum: Arthropoda
- Subphylum: Chelicerata
- Class: Arachnida
- Order: Amblypygi
- Family: Phrynidae
- Genus: Phrynus
- Species: P. marginemaculatus

Binomial name
- Phrynus marginemaculatus C. L. Koch, 1841

= Phrynus marginemaculatus =

Species of whip scorpion

Phrynus marginemaculatus, simply known as spotted tailless whip scorpion is a species of amblypygid found in southern Florida, the Bahamas, Cuba, and Hispaniola. They are nocturnal predators that hide during the day in small retreats.

== Description ==
The body of P. marginemaculatus can measure up to 18 millimetres (0.71 in) long, but its front legs can reach 100 millimetres (3.9 in) long. It has eight legs, of which six are used for walking and the first two are employed as sensory organs for detecting prey and navigating their environment. Its cephalothorax is wider than it is long and is outfitted with eight eyes. One pair of eyes is located in front and three more pairs are found on the sides. They produce no venom, but instead have pinching pedipalps and a pair of smaller chelicerae.

== Behavior ==
P. marginemaculatus use three pairs of ambulatory legs to move sideways as a crab would and one pair for sensory purposes. They capture prey using, arm-like pedipalps. P. marginemaculatus engage in agonistic interactions, where opponents use a series of displays.

== Reproduction ==
To reproduce, the male and female P. marginemaculatus by exhibiting ritualized displays in a stereotyped sequence. Males deposit a spermatophore which the female retrieves to fertilize eggs. After a few weeks to months, she exudes a brood sac containing from 12 to 20 eggs. These develop over a three-month period, and after hatching the female will then carry the first instars on her back for about ten days until they molt. About two years are needed for the young to reach adulthood, with adult life expectancy around another two to three years.
