= Xerophrynus =

Scientific classification
- Kingdom: Animalia
- Phylum: Arthropoda
- Subphylum: Chelicerata
- Class: Arachnida
- Order: Amblypygi
- Family: Phrynichidae
- Genus: Xerophrynus; Weygoldt, 1996
- Species: X. machadoi

Binomial name
- Xerophrynus machadoi (Fage, 1951)

Synonyms
- Afrophrynus Lawrence, 1967

Monotypic genus of arachnid

Xerophrynus is a monotypic genus of whipspiders containing only the species Xerophrynus machadoi.

== Distribution and habitat ==
Xerophrynus machadoi is endemic to the highland and escarpment regions of southwestern Angola and northwestern Namibia. It is known from less than ten localities. The species tends to retreat into deep crevices in the rock during the dry season. Like the confamilial Phrynichodamon scullyi, genetic analysis is needed to determine whether the geographically separated populations of X. machadoi actually constitute a single species.
