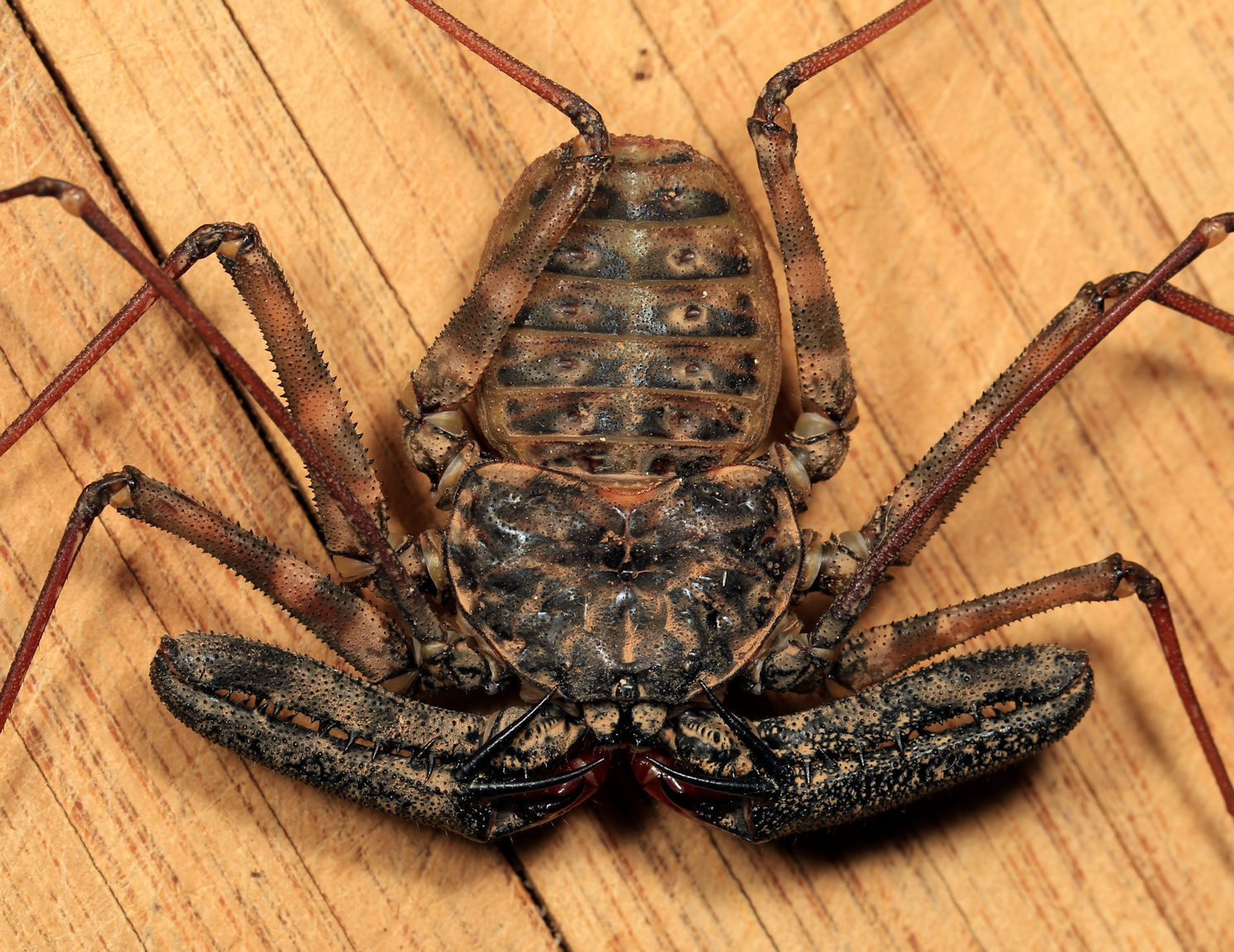

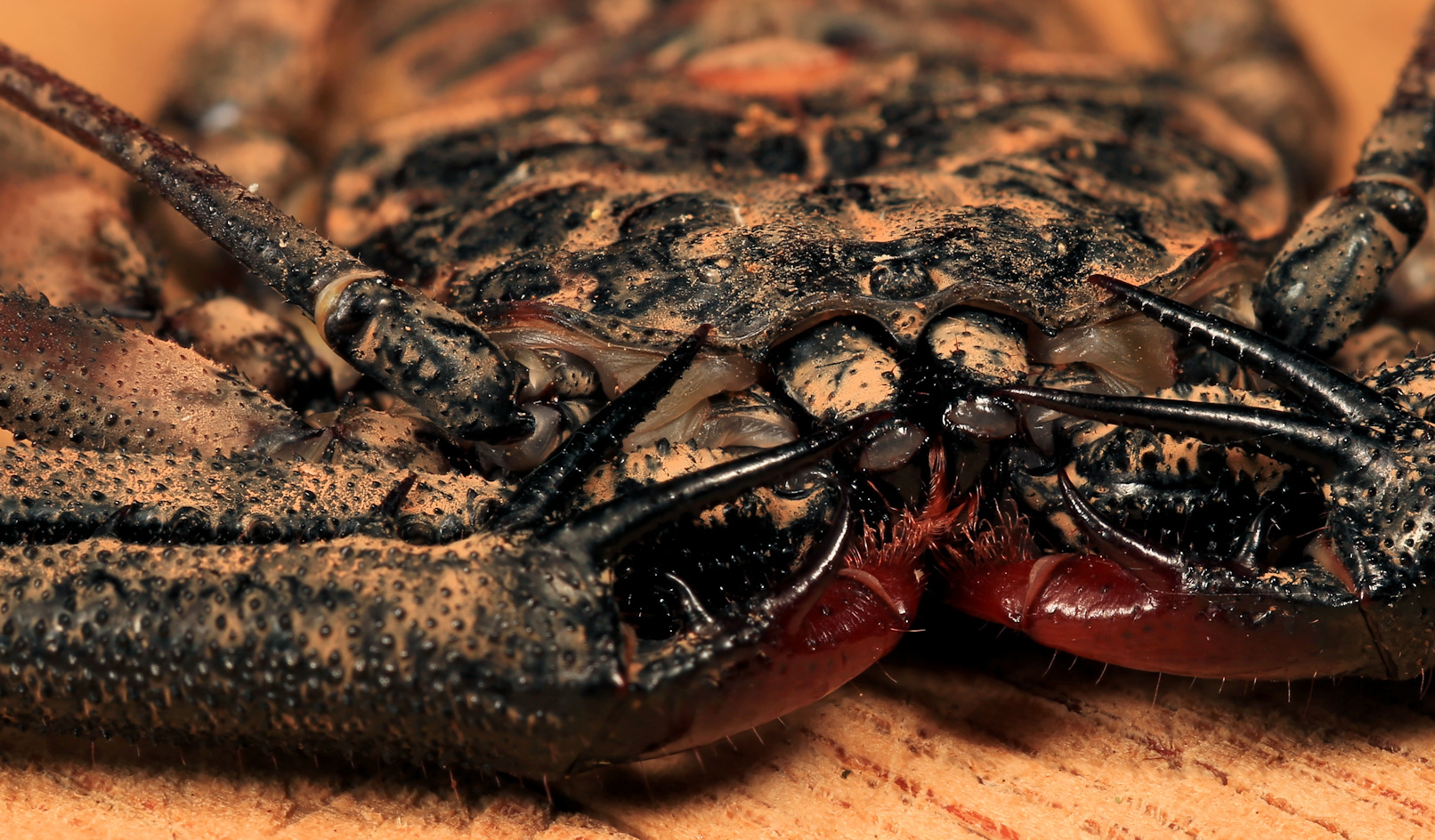

Scientific classification
- Kingdom: Animalia
- Phylum: Arthropoda
- Subphylum: Chelicerata
- Class: Arachnida
- Order: Amblypygi
- Family: Phrynichidae
- Genus: Damon
- Species: D. variegatus

Binomial name
- Damon variegatus (Perty, 1834)

= Damon variegatus =

Species of whipspider endemic to Southern Africa

Damon variegatus is a species of whipspider, also known as the common whipspider (or African whip spider), in the family Phrynichidae. It is endemic to Southern Africa.

== Range ==
It is found from the DRC and Tanzania down to South Africa and Namibia. In 2005, the population west of the Kalahari Desert (in Namibia and southern Angola) was moved to Damon sylviae.

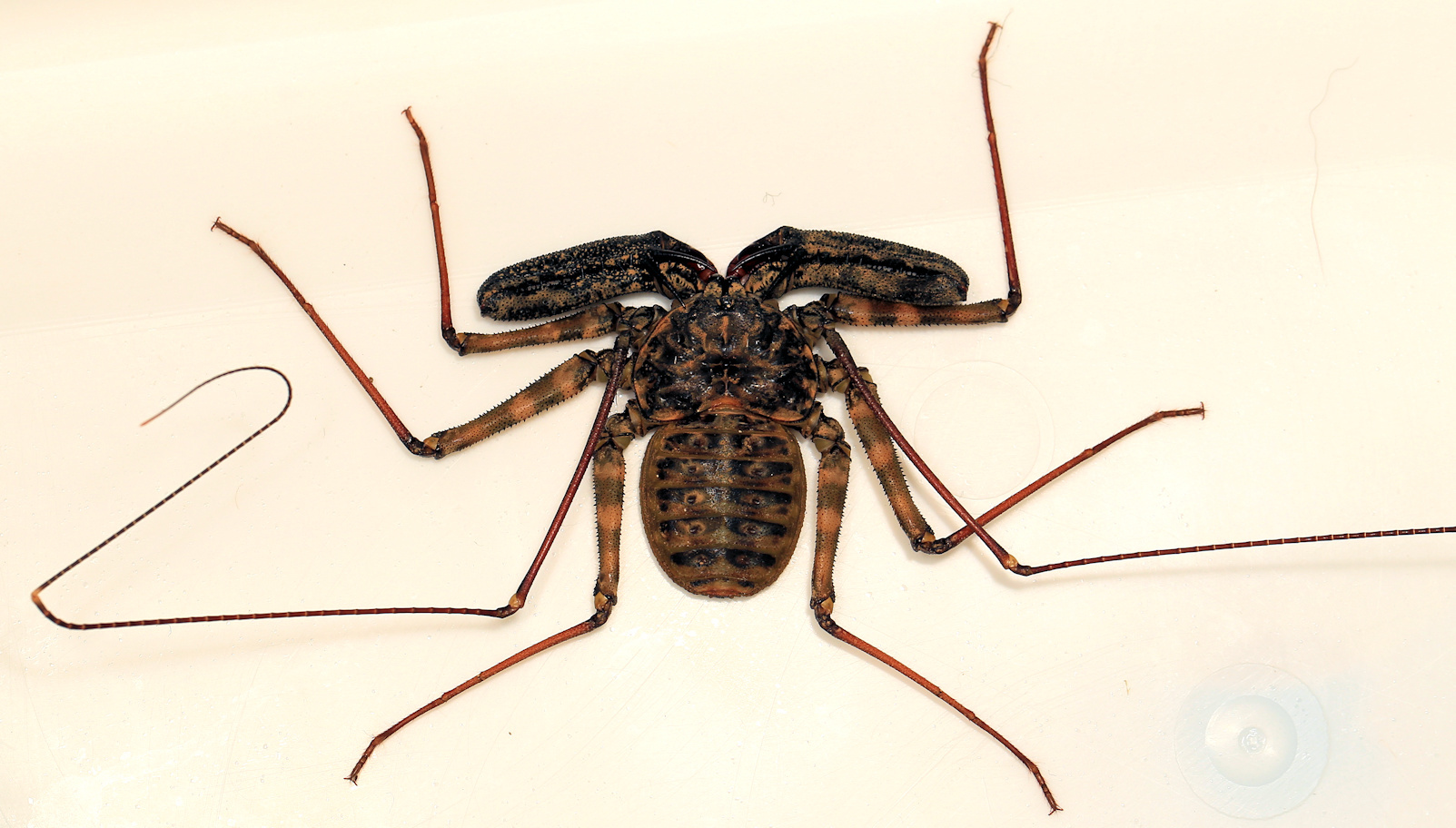
