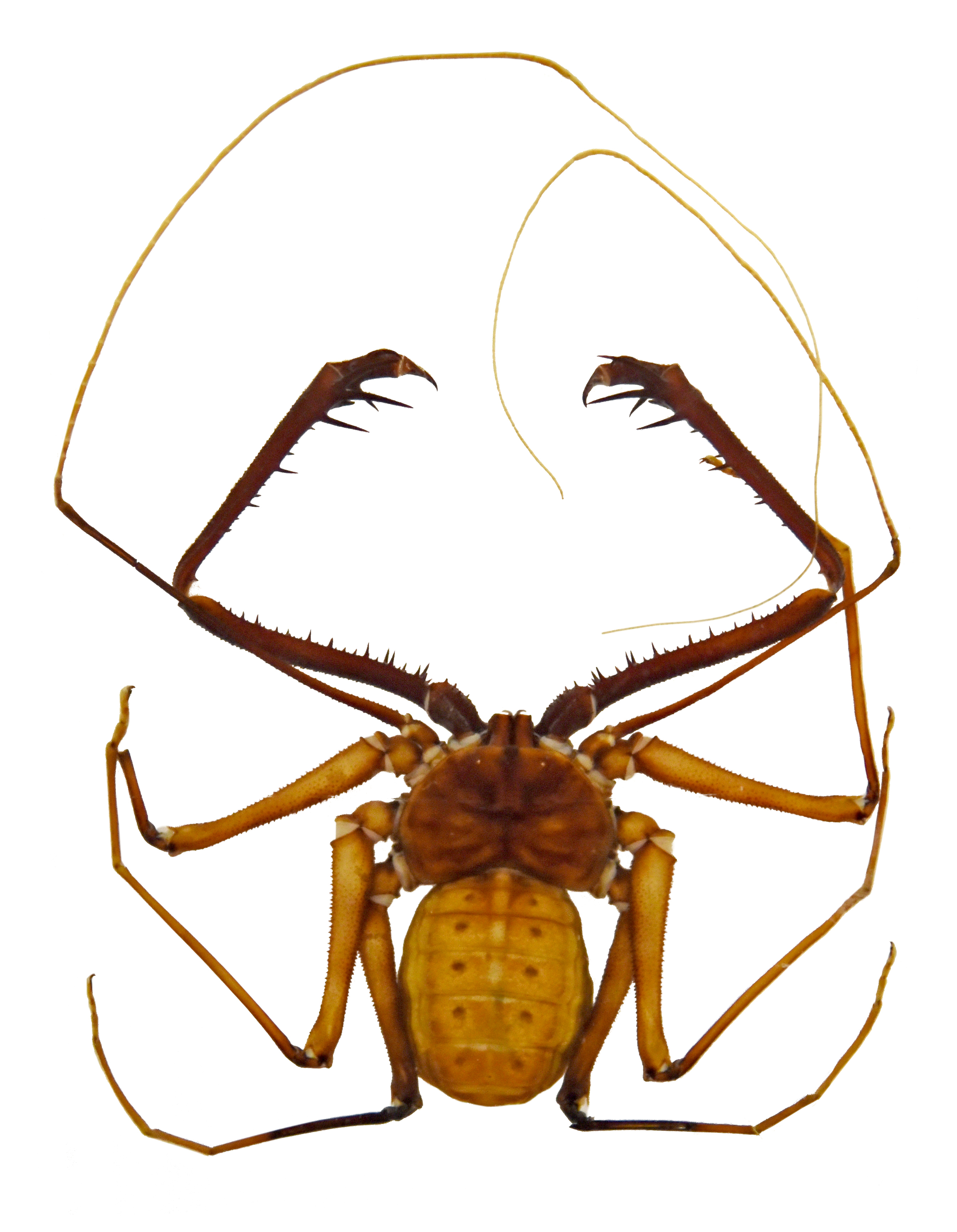

Scientific classification
- Kingdom: Animalia
- Phylum: Arthropoda
- Subphylum: Chelicerata
- Class: Arachnida
- Order: Amblypygi
- Family: Phrynichidae
- Genus: Damon
- Species: D. medius

Binomial name
- Damon medius (Herbst, 1797)

Synonyms
- Phalangium medium Herbst, 1797; Phrynus bassamensis Lucas, 1858; Phrynus kochii Butler, 1873; Phrynus granulosus Bulter, 1873; Phrynus savatieri Rochebrune, 1883

= Damon medius =

Species of whipspider

Damon medius is a species of whipspider of the family Phrynichidae.

== Description ==
Damon medius can reach a body length of 3–4 centimetres (1.2–1.6 in). This strictly arboreal and nocturnal whip spider has a flat body and fragile legs, by which it moves sideways like a crab. In males the front legs are very long and antenniform, much longer than in the females. It has two large, spiny pedipalps, which are larger in the male than the female. It feeds on small insects.

== Distribution and habitat ==
This species can be found in West Africa, in Benin, Ghana, Guinea, Ivory Coast, Cameroon, Liberia, Mali, Nigeria, São Tomé and Príncipe, Senegal, Sierra Leone and Togo. It lives in wetlands and rainforests.
