= Weygoldtia =

Scientific classification
- Kingdom: Animalia
- Phylum: Arthropoda
- Subphylum: Chelicerata
- Class: Arachnida
- Order: Amblypygi
- Family: Charinidae
- Genus: Weygoldtia; Miranda, Giupponi, Prendini & Scharff, 2018

Type species
- Weygoldtia davidovi (Fage, 1946)

Species
- 3, see text

Genus of whip scorpions

Weygoldtia is a genus of amblypygids of the family Charinidae, described in 2018 by Gustavo Silva de Miranda, Alessandro P.L. Giupponi, Lorenzo Prendini and Nikolaj Scharff. The genus is named after the German arachnologist Peter Weygoldt, in recognition of his contributions to the study of Amblypygi.

== Species ==
As of October 2022, there are three species in this genus, all distributed in Southeast Asia.

- Weygoldtia consonensis Miranda, Giupponi, Prendini & Scharff, 2021 – Vietnam
- Weygoldtia davidovi (Fage, 1946) – Cambodia, Laos, Vietnam
- Weygoldtia hainanensis Zhu, Li & He, 2021 – China
