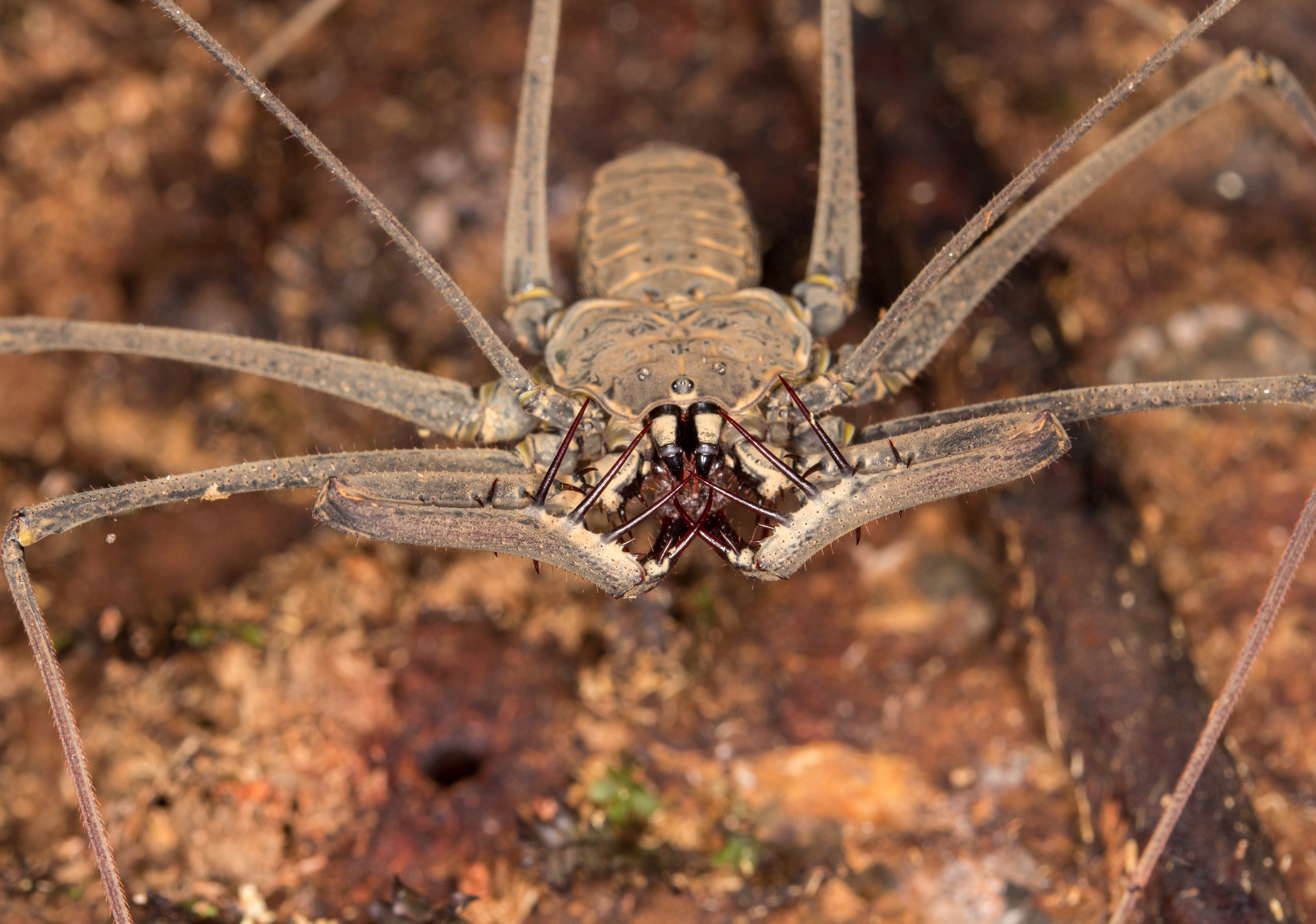
- Heterophrynus, Ecuador

Scientific classification
- Kingdom: Animalia
- Phylum: Arthropoda
- Subphylum: Chelicerata
- Class: Arachnida
- Clade: Tetrapulmonata
- Order: Amblypygi; Thorell, 1883

Families
- Palaeoamblypygi; Paracharontidae; †Weygoldtinidae; Euamblypygi; Charontidae; Phrynichidae; Phrynidae

Synonyms
- Phrynéides Walckenaer, 1837; Phrynichida Petrunkevitch, 1945

= Amblypygi =

Amblypygi Temporal range: Bashkirian/Moscovian–Holocene 315–0 Ma

Order of arachnids

Amblypygi is an order of arachnids also known as whipspiders or tailless whipscorpions. The name "amblypygid" means "blunt tail", a reference to a lack of the flagellum that is otherwise seen in whipscorpions. Amblypygids possess no silk glands or venom. They rarely bite if threatened but can grab fingers with their pedipalps, resulting in thorn-like puncture injuries.

As of 2026, five families, 18 genera, and around 280 species had been discovered and described. They are found in tropical and subtropical regions worldwide, mainly in warm and humid environments. They like to stay protected and hidden within leaf litter, caves, or underneath bark. Some species are subterranean; all are nocturnal. Fossilized amblypygids have been found dating back to the Carboniferous period, such as Weygoldtina.

== Description ==
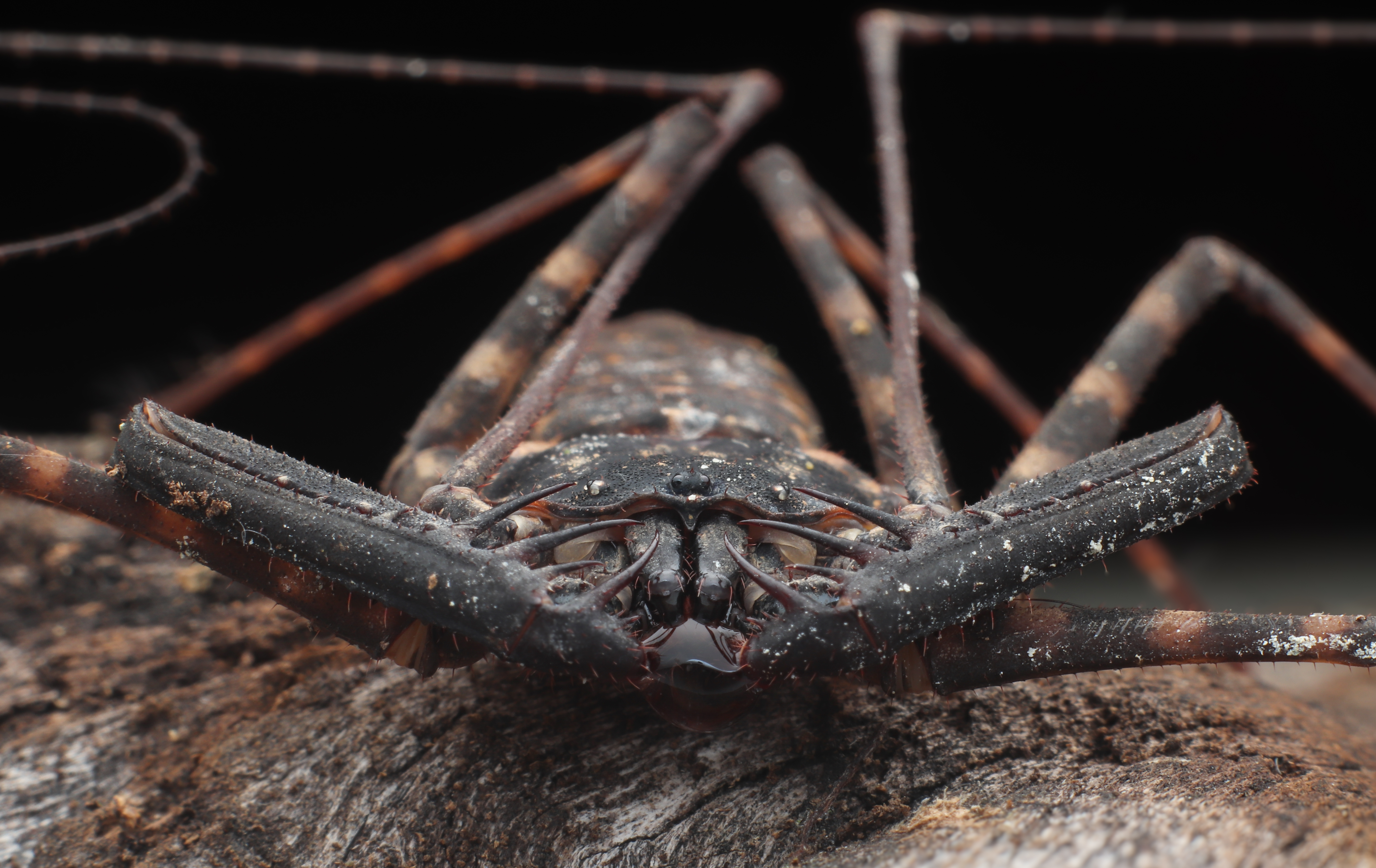
Front view of pedipalps (Charon, Philippines)

=== Morphology ===
Being arachnids, Amblypygi possess two body segments; the prosoma and the opisthosoma (often referred to as the cephalothorax and abdomen), four pairs of legs, pedipalps, and chelicerae. The first pair of legs act as sensory organs and are not used for walking. The sensory legs are very thin and elongated, have numerous sensory receptors, and can extend several times the length of the body. Their bodies are broad and highly flattened, with an undivided prosoma and a segmented opisthosoma. Most species have eight eyes; a pair of median eyes at the front of the carapace above the chelicerae and 2 smaller clusters of three eyes each further back on each side.

==== Size ====
Amblypygids range from 5 to 29 cm (2.0 to 11.4 in) in walking legspan. The elongated first pair of legs, however, can reach extreme lengths of up to 60 cm (24 in) in total. If sensory legs are counted, the largest amblypygid species are the largest arachnids in the world by legspan, with some of the larger species of the genus Heterophrynus being among the largest whipspiders in sensory and walking legspan. Previously autotomized whip legs that have regrown fully upon being regenerated grow even longer than their non-autotomized counterparts.

The largest whipspider by body size is Acanthophrynus, another species with very large overall dimensions, with a total body length of up to 45 mm (1.8 in). Some species, especially those in the family Phrynichidae, also have extremely elongated pedipalps, with Euphrynichus reaching nearly 40 cm (16 in) across the extended pedipalps.

==== Pedipalps ====
Amblypygids have raptorial pedipalps modified for grabbing and retaining prey, much like the forelegs of mantises. The pedipalps are generally covered in spines, used for impaling and capturing prey. They are kept folded in front of the prosoma when not in use. Whipspider pedipalps often display sexual dimorphism in their size and shape, with males generally having longer pedipalps in sexually dimorphic species. The two longest segments, the femur and tibia (or patella, see below), oppose one another and often form a spiny catching basket to ensnare prey between them. In other species, the long segments are nearly free of spines, with a long-spined "hand" at the end used to capture prey.

Most whipspider species hold their pedipalps horizontally, folded in front of the body, when at rest, with only the joint between the pedipalp trochanter and femur allowing rotation into the vertical plane. Some species, such as those of the genus Phrynus, hold their pedipalp femurs vertically while hunting prey or during courtship. The two species in the family Paracharontidae, the most basal extant amblypygid lineage and the only living paleoamblypygi, have pedipalps that articulate vertically, as do ancient extinct species. Many Charontid species fold the pedipalps at a more oblique angle in front of the body, closer to this ancestral configuration.

===== Pedipalp segmentation =====
Scholarly opinion has varied on the nomenclature of the pedipalp segments. There is consensus that the first three segments of the whipspider pedipalp are, in proximal to distal order, the coxa, trochanter, and femur. However, the homology of segments with other arachnid orders and thus the naming of the latter pedipalp segments has been debated. For instance, in a paper discussing the genus Phrynus, arachnologist Diomedes Quintero named the segments as: coxa, trochanter, femur, tibia, basitarsus, and tarsus, omitting the final claw segment which is fused with the tarsus in the Phrynidae. In his 2000 book on whipspider biology, Peter Weygoldt also favored this nomenclature with the additional mention of the claw segment and the terming of the second to last segment as the distitarsus.

Other authors have favored a different naming scheme of segments with the fourth segment being the patella, rather than the tibia. This arrangement was formally proposed in 1998 by Mark Harvey and Paul West, following its use by several authors in the 1900s, with the segments in order being the coxa, trochanter, femur, patella, tibia, and tarsus, with the tarsus being further divided in some species. This terminology was followed in a 2021 revision of the family Charinidae, as well as other work.

In this article, the terminology of Weygoldt (2000) is generally followed for consistency.

===== Pedipalp morphology =====
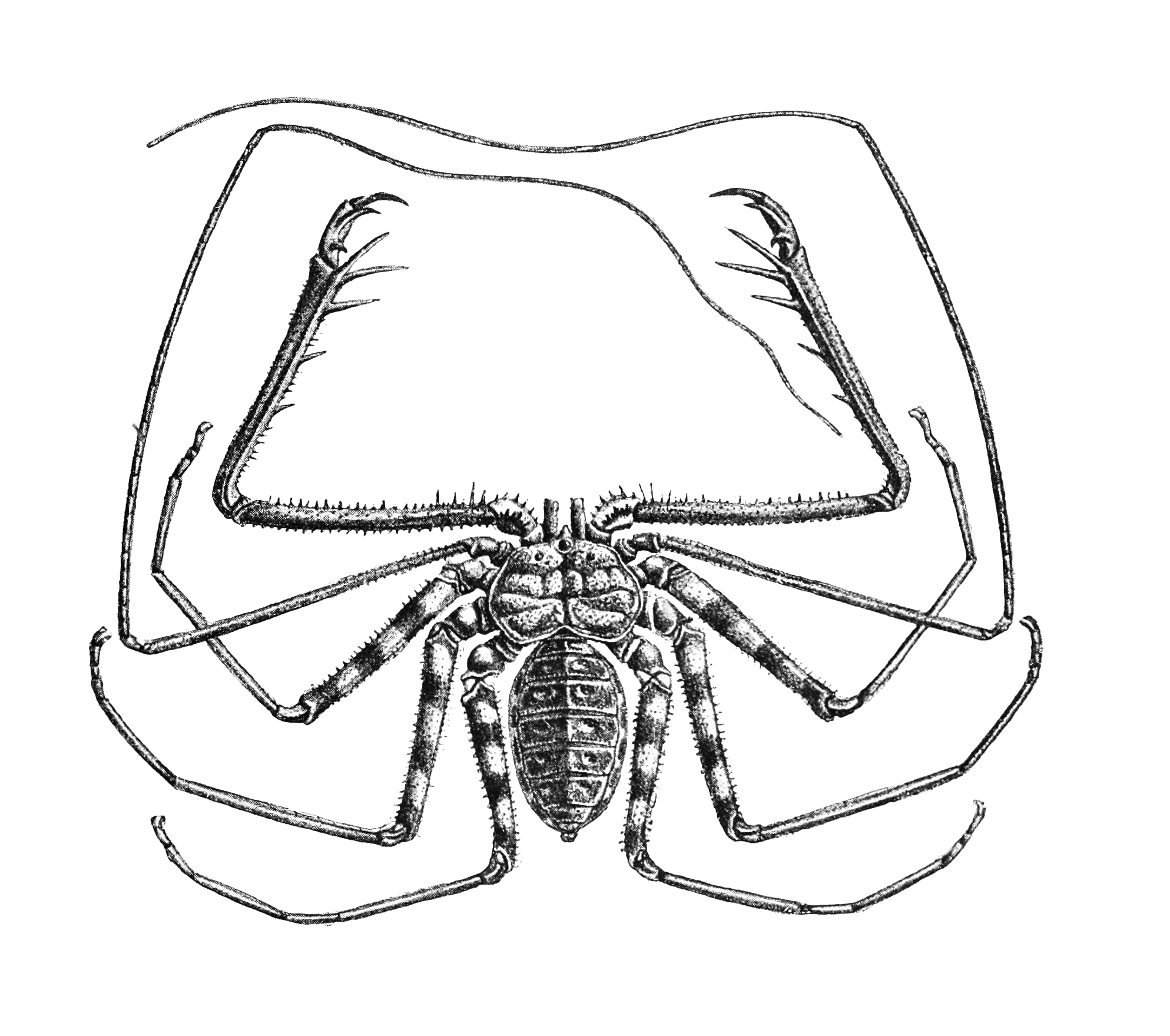
Illustration of a Phrynichid whipspider, Damon johnstonii from West Africa

Pedipalp morphology is often described, and taxa differentiated, with reference to the arrangement of the spines, particularly those of the tibia. Spines are divided into primary and secondary spines, the primary spines being those that are present in the earliest free living instars, with the secondary spines being added during later growth. Usually there are three primary spines present on the dorsal side of the pedipalp tibia, although Phrynus and Paraphrynus have 5 and 6 primary dorsal spines, respectively.

Pedipalp morphology varies across the amblypygi, with configurations often conforming to a particular style of prey capture. The pedipalps of some genera, such as Euphrynicus and others in the family Phrynichidae, are extremely long, and free of large spines until near the extreme distal end of the appendage, where a jointed "hand" is formed from spines and the tarsus of the appendage. Others have shorter pedipalps with an increased number of large dorsal and ventral spines, forming a "catching basket" for prey capture.

==== Legs ====
The walking legs of amblypygi are segmented into, in order proximally to distally, the coxa, trochanter, femur, patella, tibia, and tarsus. The patella is typically short, and the joint between it and the tibia very inflexible. The tibia is divided into two segments, in proximal to distal order the basitibia and distitibia. In most species, the basitibia of the fourth leg is further divided into two to four articles, being undivided only in Phrynichus and Phrynichodamon. These inter-tibial joints are not muscled and can only be bent passively, for example during grooming with the pedipalps.

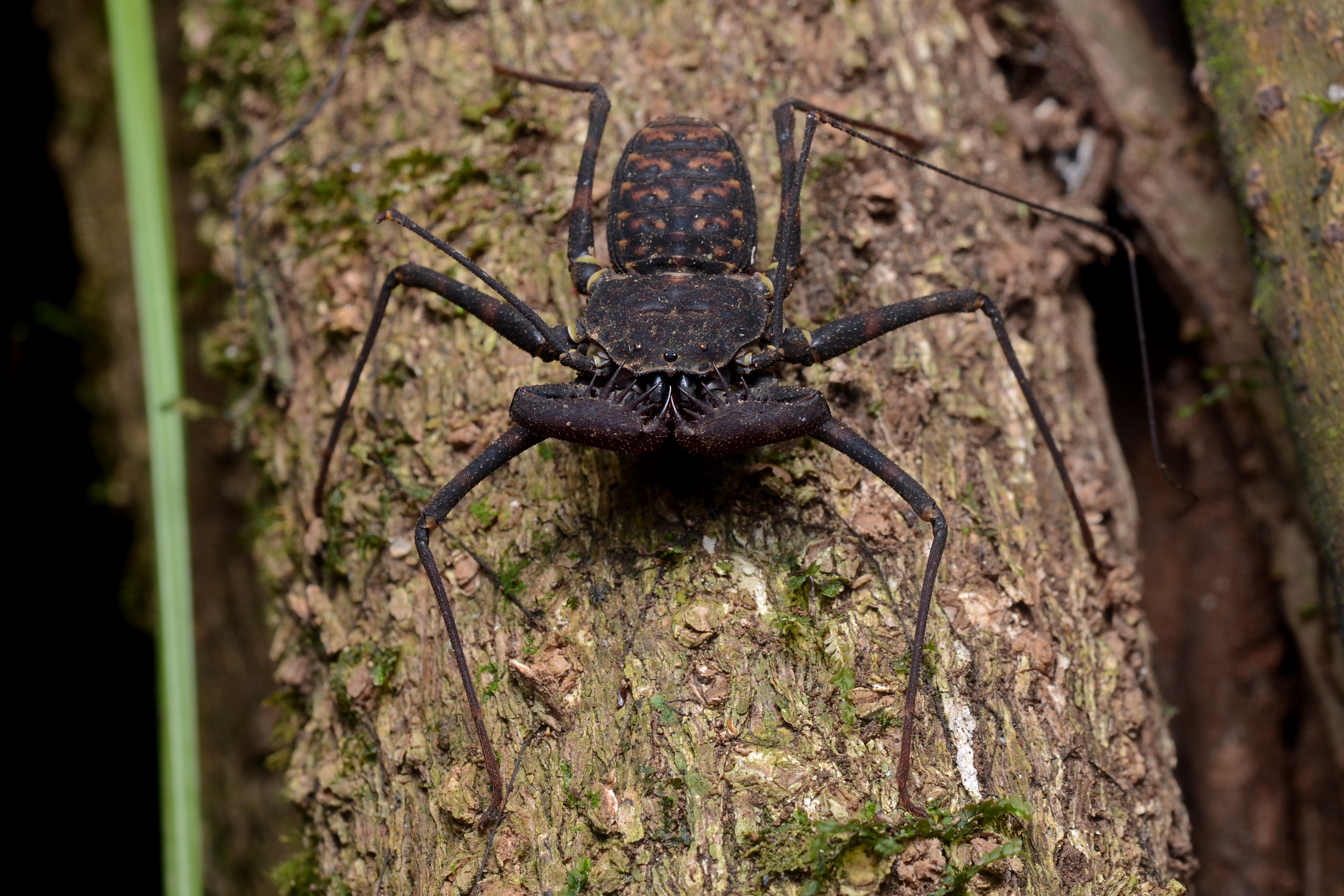
Top view of an amblypygid in the genus Phrynus. Note the right whip leg autotomized at the patella-tibia joint

Whipspiders autotomize their legs at the joint between the patella and tibia. The portion of the leg that is autotomized is then able to be regenerated, eventually reaching full size after multiple molts. Regeneration may alter the subdivision of the basitibia of walking legs.

Amblypygi grasp the substrate on which they climb with the aid of tarsal claws at the tips of each walking leg, similar to those present in spiders. Additionally, some species, such as Paracharon and the Charontidae, possess pulvilli (adhesive pads) on the tarses, allowing them to climb smooth surfaces such as glass.

==== Exoskeleton ====
Whip-spiders are covered with a layer of a solidified secretion that forms a super-hydrophobic coating. Studies on the spotted tailless whip-scorpion also show their exoskeleton is enriched with several trace-elements, including calcium, magnesium, manganese, potassium, sodium, and zinc, which tends to accumulate as the individual gets older. The same trace-elements are also present in the exoskeleton of the other members of Tetrapulmonata. Like other arachnids, an amblypygid will molt several times during its life. Molting is done while hanging from the underside of a horizontal surface in order to use gravity to assist in separating the old exoskeleton from the animal.

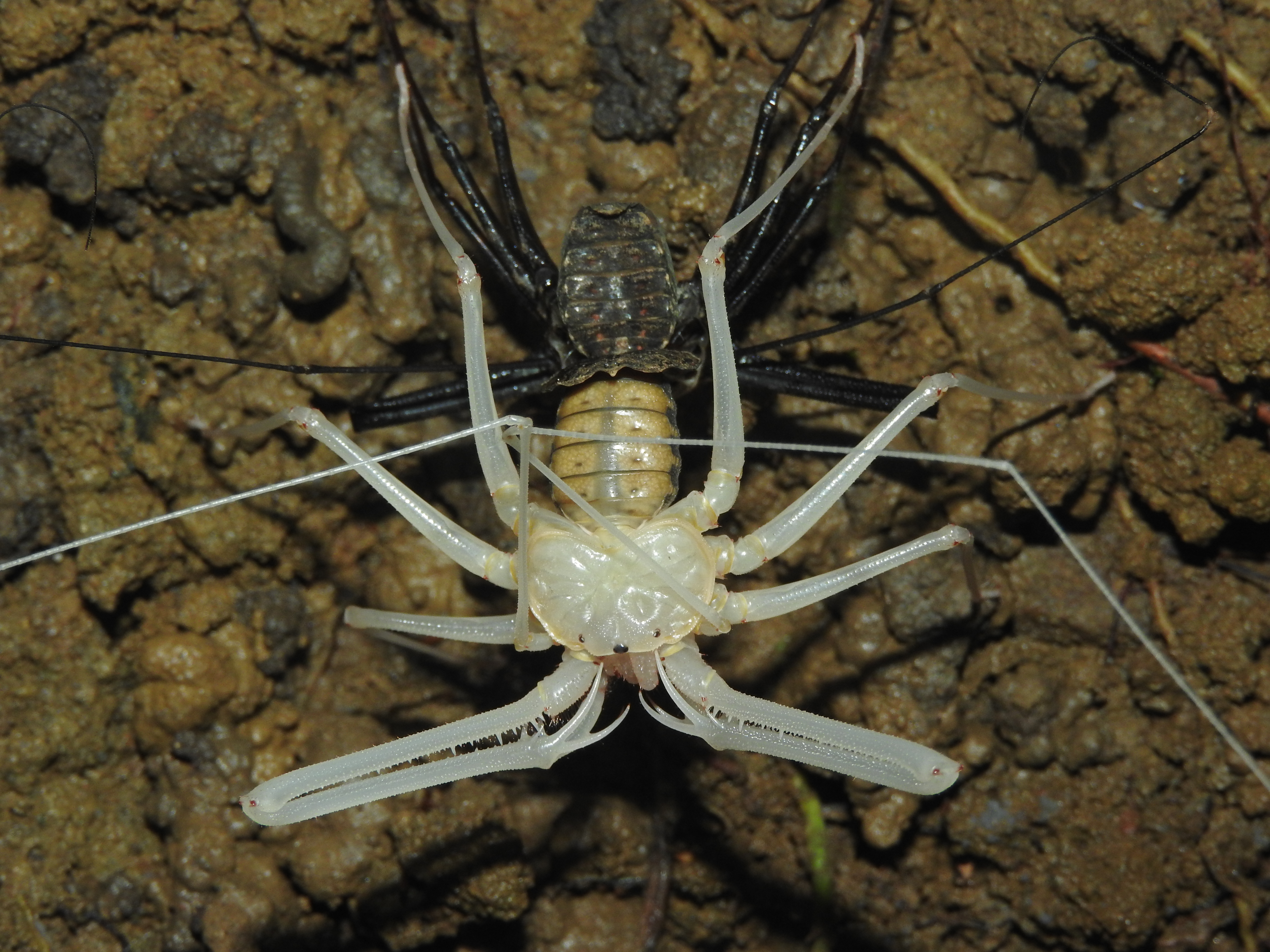
An amblypygid molting

=== Anatomy ===
==== Circulatory system ====
Similarly to other arachnids, the circulatory fluid of amblypygi is known as hemolymph. It is analogous to the blood of vertebrates, but oxygen is attached to the copper-containing protein hemocyanin rather than hemoglobin. Hemocyanins are blue when oxygenated and colorless when deoxygenated, giving hemolymph a blueish color.

As is the case with other arthropods, amblypygids have an open circulatory system. The heart consists of a muscular tube running lengthwise along the dorsal center of the opisthosoma. At its anterior end, its largest single connection, the aorta anterior transports blood to a large sinus and several branching aortas that supply blood to the chelicerae, pedipalps, legs, and organs of the prosoma. In the opisthosoma, lateral arteries branch directly off from the walls of the heart, supplying blood to the opisthosoma. A small aorta at the far posterior tip of the heart, the aorta posterior, also serves this purpose. Hemolymph flow is checked by passive valves at each aorta and artery connection to the heart, which open during the systole (heart contraction) and close during diastole, maintaining unidirectional flow of hemolymph.

Respiration takes place in the book lungs on the underside of the opisthosoma. After supplying oxygen to the organs and tissues of the opisthosoma, hemolymph flows into a paired longitudinal ventral sinus. It then flows through the sinuses surrounding the posterior and then anterior book lungs, becoming oxygenated. The oxygenated blood flows through two pulmo-pericardial sinuses to the pericardial sinus, surrounding the heart. From there, blood is drawn back into the heart through ostia—slit like openings in the side of the heart that open and close opposite to the aortic and arterial valves.

==== Nervous system ====
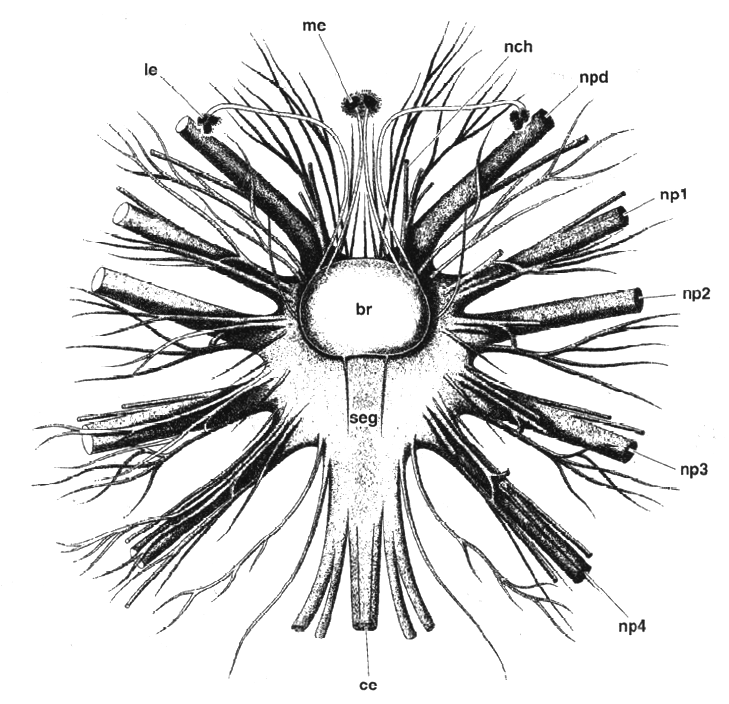
Illustration of the central nervous system of an amblypygid, 1904. br = brain/supraesophageal ganglion; ce = cauda equina, opisthomal nerve; le = lateral eyes; me = median eyes; nch = cheliceral nerve; np1-np4 = nerves of the first through fourth pairs of legs; npd = pedipalp nerve; seg = subesophageal ganglion.

The central nervous system of whipspiders is contained within the prosoma. Similarly to spiders, it is mainly composed of a supraesophageal ganglion and subesophageal ganglion, so named for their positions above and below the esophagus and sucking stomach, also located in the prosoma. The supraesophageal ganglion is also referred to as the "brain" of the amblypygid, and is smaller than the subesophageal. It contains the protocerebrum and connections to the eyes and chelicerae. The much larger subesophageal ganglion contains the ganglia of all the other limbs of the whipspider, and those of the opisthosoma. Large mushroom bodies, the largest among all arthropods except horseshoe crabs, make up a large portion of the brain, receiving visual and olfactory sensory inputs.

==== Sense organs ====
The most important sensory structures of whipspiders are the antenniform "whip" legs, which are covered in numerous sensilla (singular: sensillum), small sense organs of the cuticle. Additionally, other sensors are present on the six walking legs, and elsewhere on the body. The eyes of amblypygi are small and of little importance compared to other sensory methods, such as their extremely acute chemoreception and mechanoreception.

===== Eyes =====
While they usually possess eight eyes, amblypygi have extremely poor vision. Typically, eight eyes are arranged in three clusters, with two eyes located in a medial eye cluster, and six total lateral eyes in one group of three per side. In species that primarily inhabit caves, the median, lateral, or all eyes may be reduced or absent. All whipspider eyes are what are known as ocelli, or simple arthropod eyes, similarly to spiders. Amblypygi are sensitive to being suddenly illuminated, using their limited vision to find dark hiding places. The eyes are of little importance to the navigational abilities of amblypygi, with blinded individuals usually being able to return to their home hiding place, and olfactory deprivation having a stronger effect than visual impairment.

===== Leg sensilla =====
The legs, and in particular the flexible many-articulated tarsus segments of the antenniform pair, are densely populated with chemoreceptors for olfaction and mechanoreceptors for touch and sensing air currents.

The most numerous and the longest of the hair-type sinsilla on the tibiae and tarsi of the whip legs are bristles. Several dendrites contained within the bristles run to a terminal pore at the tip, with two other dendrites ending at the base of the bristle having characteristics of mechanoreceptive neurons. The bristles are the only sensilla that have a distinct socket and moveable shaft, and touching them causes action potentials. The bristles are thought to respond to both mechanical and chemical stimuli. Some bristles are flattened in shape, which may allow them to be more responsive to air currents.

The tip of an amblypygid antenniform leg, Sarax seychellarum. A. view of most distal article showing rod sensilla. B. closeup showing reduced tarsal claws. C. another view of the last tarsal article showing rod sensilla and olfactory setae. D. Rod sensilla and olfactory setae.

Trichobothria, also known as filiform hairs, are more numerous on the walking legs but are also present on the antenniform legs. They consist of a long and slender shaft mounted in a deep socket. They are considered to be tactile organs, with those of the walking legs capable of detecting tiny air currents from prey up to 60 cm (24 in) away. The longest trichobothria, up to 2 mm (0.079 in) long on the walking legs, typically cause an escape response when stimulated while the shorter trichobothria of the antenniform legs do not.

A few types of sensilla have less clearly understood functions. Pore hairs, small non-socketed sensilla with perforated thin walls, are suspected to react to olfactory stimuli. They are numerous on the distal tarsi of the antenniform legs. The smallest sensilla, the club sensilla, have mostly unknown function. They are bulbous-tipped, hence their name, and nonsocketed, thought to likely be chemoreceptors. Rod hairs occur clustered in one group per division of the distal tarsus of the antenniform legs. They have no currently known function.

Occurring in the cuticle of the legs are the slit sensilla. They are tiny slits, only around 3 μm wide, covered with thin cuticle membrane, with dendrites attached. Generally speaking, they measure the strain of the cuticle, analogous to manmade strain gauges. This strain detection is used for proprioception or sensing vibration, depending on the slit sensillum. When grouped closely together, slit sensilla are known as lyriform organs. In spiders lyriform organs are used as vibration sensors and propriocepters, and are more common than in whipspiders.

At the tip of the antenniform leg tarsus, there is a small pit containing several raised pore openings, each with several dendrites exposed. This structure is known as the pit organ, which may function as a hygroreceptor, detecting moisture. Also at the tarsal tip are three highly reduced, tiny tarsal claws. They are finely innervated and may serve as contact chemoreceptors.

== Distribution and Ecology ==
=== Distribution ===
Whipspiders are distributed worldwide within tropical and subtropical regions, with a small number of species occurring in more temperate areas. Genera are typically geographically restricted to specific areas of the world, although the genus Charinus is distributed worldwide. The family Phrynidae is distributed within the Neotropical realm, along with Charinus and one phrynichid genus, Trichodamon.

The Phrynichidae occur within the tropical and subtropical regions of the old world. Most Phrynichid genera are distributed only within Africa, although Phrynichus also ranges into the Middle East, the Indian subcontinent, and Southeast Asia. Enigmatically, one Asian Phrynid species, Phrynus exsul, has been described from Indonesia.

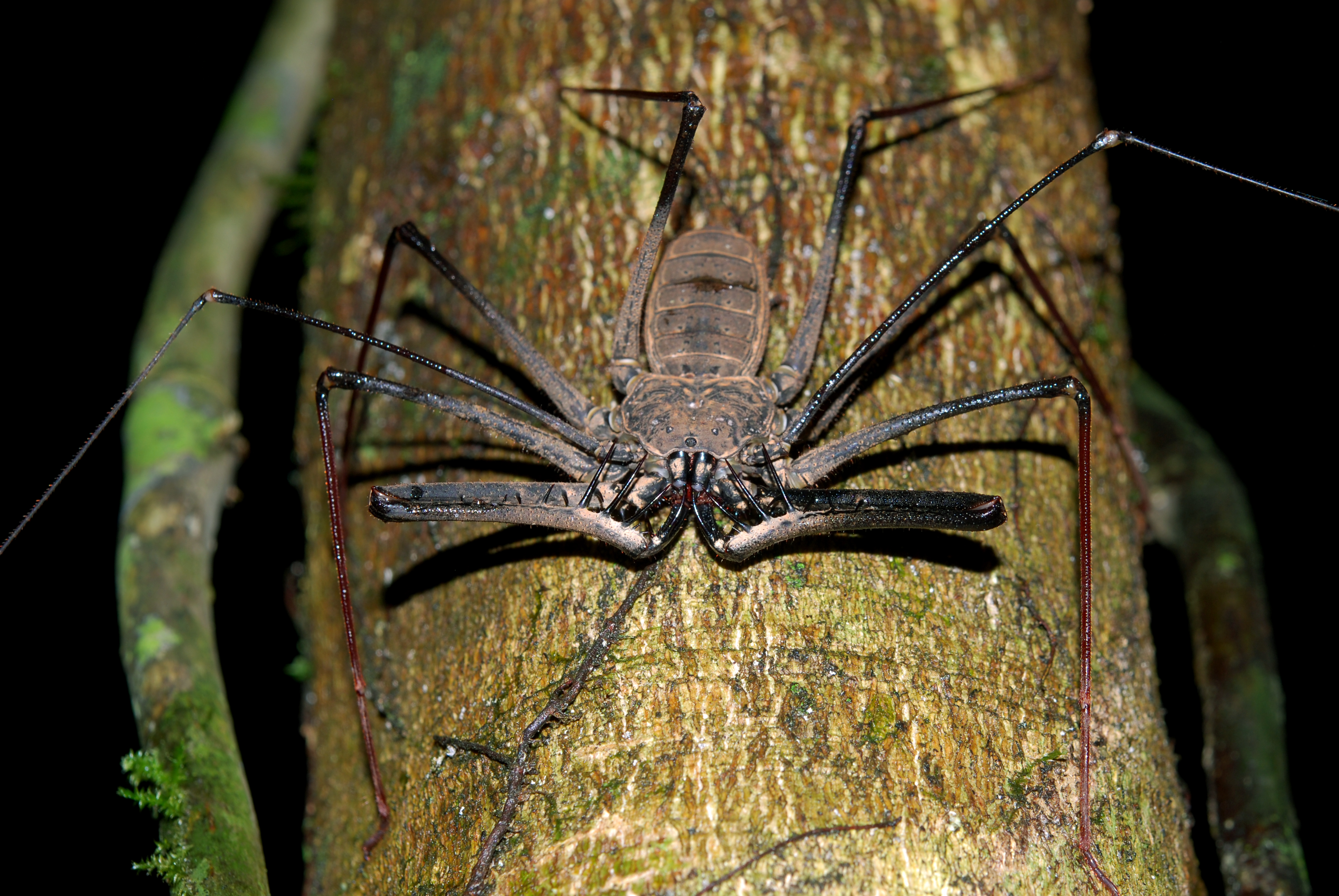
Heterophrynus on a tree, Ecuador. Whipspiders in rainforest environments spend much of their time on trees.

The family Charontidae (including the now junior synonym Charinidae) are most diversely distributed within Asia, although as mentioned previously Charinus is distributed worldwide. Charon ranges into Australia, representing the only Oceanian amblypygi. Sarax ioanniticus is the only whipspider found in Europe, distributed around the Eastern Mediterranean.

=== Ecology ===
Amblypygi almost always prefer humid environments, although some species occur in arid regions. Caves and forests are very common habitats, with some species being entirely cave dwelling. Species that inhabit dry areas often seek out humid microhabitats, such as rock crevices, in order to conserve moisture, or have adaptations to make them more resistant to desiccation than other species.

== Behavior ==
Amblypygids have eight legs, but use only six for walking, often in a crab-like, sideways fashion. The front pair of legs are modified for use as antennae-like feelers, with many fine segments giving the appearance of a "whip". When suitable prey is located with the antenniform legs, the amblypygid seizes its victim with large spines on the grasping pedipalps, impaling and immobilizing the prey. This is typically done while climbing the side of a vertical surface and facing downward toward their prey.

=== Reproduction ===
Whipspiders reproduce by indirect spermatophore transfer, in which the male deposits a stalked spermatophore containing sperm bodies upon the substrate which the female picks up to fertilize her eggs. Spermatophores are also used in this way by scorpions. The male deposites the spermatophore and lures the female towards it during an often long and elaborate courtship process.

==== Courtship ====
Amblypygid courtship is often extremely intricate and time consuming. Exact behavior varies from species to species, but generally follows the following phases:

1. Courtship
2. Spermatophore formation
3. Luring the female to the spermatophore
4. Sperm transfer
5. Post-mating behavior

In the courtship phase—sometimes referred to as a courtship dance—the male taps the female with his antenniform legs, approaching her periodically and touching or stroking her with his pedipalps. This may involve grasping or stroking the females pedipalps. In the elaborate courtship dances of Phrynichus scaber and P. ceylonicus, the male sometimes grabs the females pedipalp tarsus and walks around, leading the female. Typically, females have a relatively passive role in courtship, reacting to the male's actions. However, Damon medius females sometimes actively initiate courtship by vibrating their antenniform legs. The length of courtship varies, taking as little as an hour in Charinus and up to eight hours for the intricate and lengthy display of Phrynichus scaber.

To form the spermatophore, the male presses his body into the substrate, secreting the material of the spermatophore and sticking it to the surface. He forms the stalk of the spermatophore by slowly raising his body as the excretion flows out of his spermatophore organ. When the stalk reaches the proper length, which varies depending on species, the male stops and forms the spermatophore head from secretions hardening within his inner genital atrium. This can take anywhere from a few minutes to up to 20 minutes, depending on the complexity of the spermatophore head. The male then pulls the completed spermatophore from under his genital operculum to begin luring the female towards it. While spermatophore production is occurring, the male continues rhythmic tapping and vibrating with his antenniform legs. Spermatophore production is intrinsically linked to the process of courtship with a female. Males with no willing female never produce spermatophores on their own.

To lure the female to take up the spermatophore, the male turns back towards the female and steps back, placing the spermatophore between them, and continues tapping and vibrating with his whip legs. The female slowly approaches and picks up the spermatophore. Usually, the spermatophore is broken off of the base during this process, but if adhesion to the surface is poor, the entire spermatophore may be taken up and left partially sticking out of the female operculum.

The genital anatomy of amblypygi is highly species-specific, with the female genitalia being specifically shaped to grasp the spermatophore and access the sperm bodies contained therein. The pair separate after the female has picked up the spermatophore. Sometimes the female may unfold her pedipalps and threaten the male, but typically there is no actual aggression. Males, and occasionally females, often eat the spermatophore stalk after mating.

==== Egg sac production ====
Developing eggs are often visible through the intersegmental membranes of the female's opisthosoma, or even through the sternites themselves if they are transparent enough. However, it may be weeks to months before the eggs are ready to be extruded. Shortly before laying eggs, the membranes of outer edges of the ventral side of the female's opisthosoma (the pleural folds) project ventrally, forming a lipped, cup-like structure that will retain the egg sac. In species adapted to drier environments, such as Damon variegatus, the pleural folds project further to cover a large portion of the egg sac, forming a brood pouch.

Oviposition is difficult to observe, due to it taking place at night and the female terminating the process when disturbed. The egg sac may also be deformed or damaged if the process is interrupted. To extrude the eggs and egg sac, the female begins by standing head upward on a vertical surface, turning head down as the eggs and fluid are extruded and bending her opisthosoma to be held more horizontally. The extruded eggs are contained in a viscous fluid, extruded simultaneously. This fluid, usually whitish or greenish at first, dries and hardens to form a dark brown covering over the eggs. The eggs are likely fertilized with stored sperm as they pass through the genital atrium, where spermatozoa are stored following mating, and uncoiled sperm cells can be detected in the egg sac fluid. The number of eggs laid varies from species to species, and within each species in rough correlation with body size.

==== Hatching and brooding ====
Eggs are ready to hatch after three to five and a half months. While they are carrying an egg sac, females will either fast completely or eat very little, in order to keep the egg sac attached to the opisthosoma. The first instar of young, the praenymphae, hatch out of the egg sac and climb onto the female's opisthosoma, staying there until they molt into their first free living instar, a period of up to 10 days. As the praenymphae molt into protonymphae and climb off, their discarded exoskeletons collect on their mothers opisthosoma.

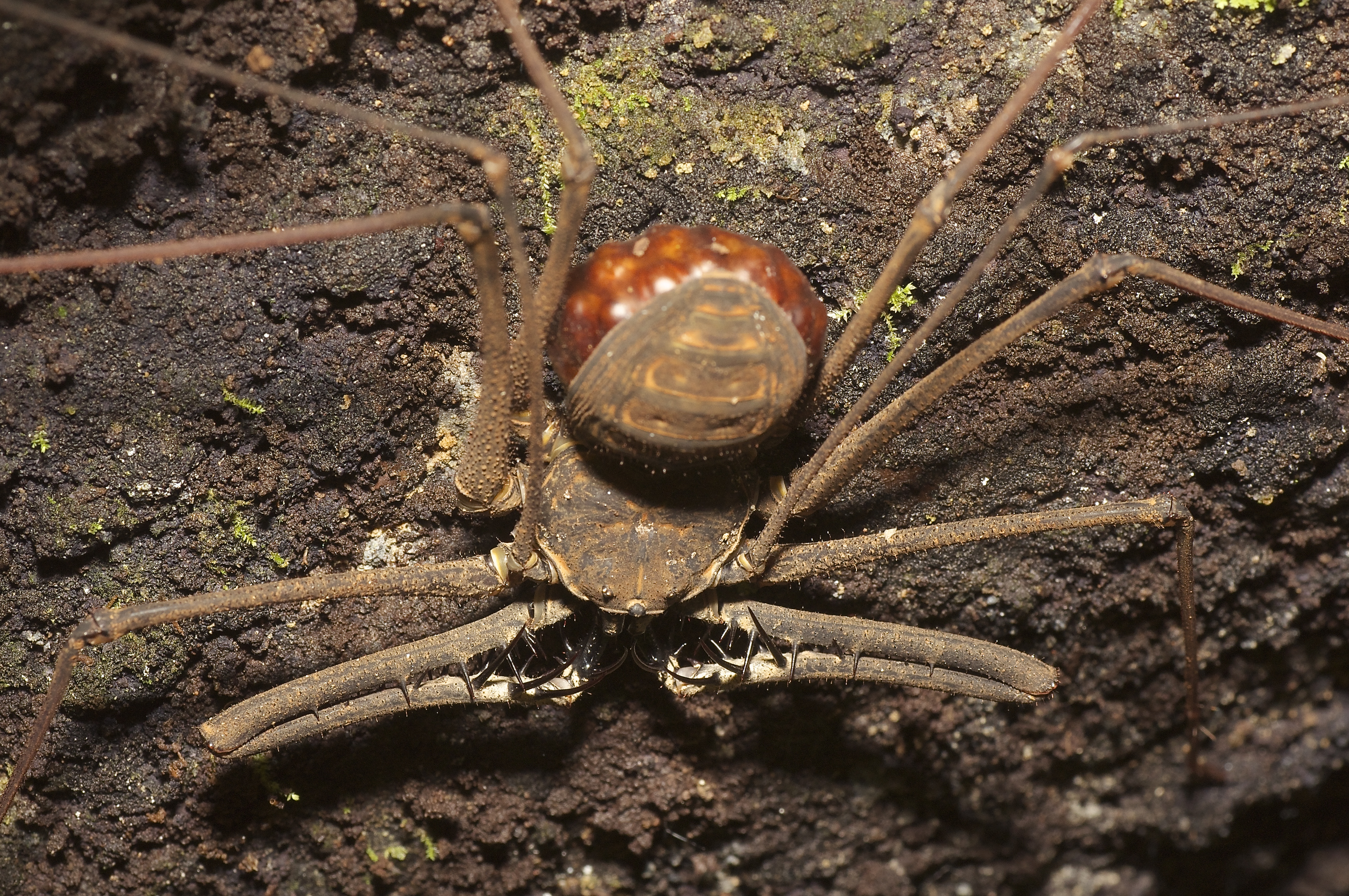
Heterophrynus mother with egg sac

Damon mother with young hatching from egg sac

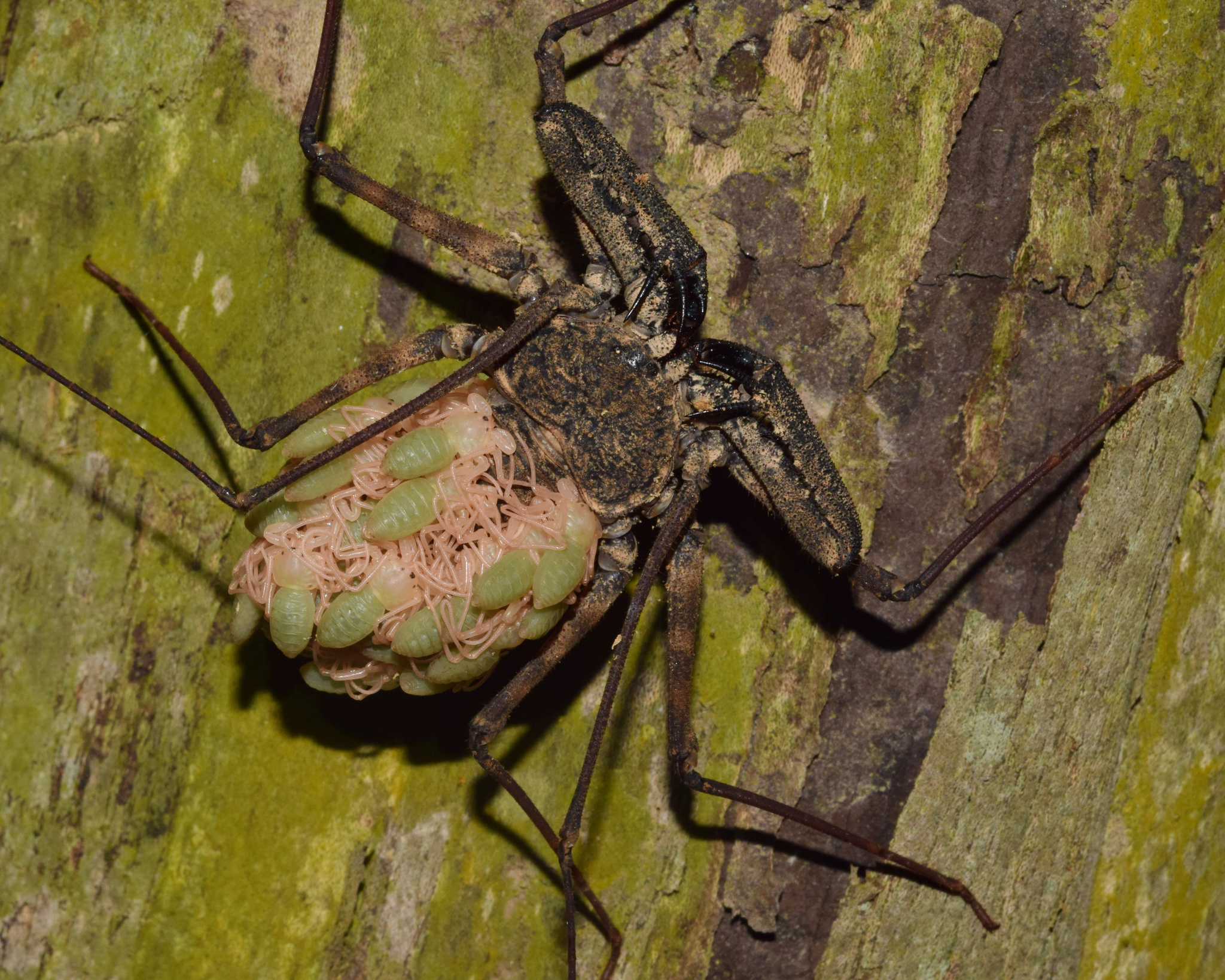
Damon mother carrying young

=== Socialization ===
In common with most other arachnids, adult whipspiders are not particularly social. However, some species may be among the few examples of arachnids that exhibit social behavior. Research conducted at Cornell University with Phrynus marginemaculatus and Damon diadema suggests that mother amblypygids communicate with their young with their antenniform front-legs, and the offspring reciprocate both with their mother and siblings. The ultimate function of this social behavior remains unknown. The amount of aggression between individuals can vary considerably even within a given genus, with Peter Weygoldt observing that Heterophrynus alces is extremely aggressive to conspecifics, while H. longicornis is often found in male-female pairs and tolerate the presence of other individuals far more. Amblypygids hold territories that they defend from other individuals.

=== Diet ===
Whipspiders mostly prey upon invertebrates, particularly insects, but they are opportunistic and have also been observed feeding on vertebrates. Amblypygids are generally sit-and-wait predators, especially larger species such as Heterophrynus. Young individuals and small species tend to forage more actively. They generally do not feed for a period of time before, during, and after molting. Female whipspiders will also often refrain from eating while carrying an egg sac and during the early development of the young, often a period of over 3 months.

Pincer-like chelicerae work to grind and chew the prey prior to ingestion. The tailless whip scorpion may go for over a month in which no food is eaten. Often this is due to pre-molt.

== Taxonomic history ==
Whipspiders—at the time as a single species—were described in Carl Linnaeus's Systema Naturae, under the name Phalangium reniforme, in a short section alongside Phalangium opilio, which has remained intact as its original usage as a harvestman. Linneus lists the habitat of P. reniforme as "in America." In the original Latin, he described its characteristics as:

...antennis corpore longioribus, thorace reniformi.

Tarantula fusca major, pedibus anterioribus crassioribus aculeatis & unguiculatis fere cheliformibus, proximis longissimis & tenuissimis.

...with antennae longer than the body, and a kidney-shaped thorax.

A large, dark tarantula; its front legs are thicker, spiny, and clawed—almost pincer-like—while the next pair are extremely long and slender.

— Carl Linnaeus, Systema Naturae, page 619

Peter Weygoldt included a tentative cladogram of the extant amblypygi in his 2000 book Whip Spiders (Chelicerata: Amblypygi): Their Biology, Morphology, and Systematics. The cladogram only showed "possible" relationships between the amblypygid genera, citing a need for a revision of the Charinidae and the uncertain placement of the genus Catageus. Weygoldt's 2000 cladogram approximation is as follows:

- Amblypygi
  - Paleoamblypygi
    Paracharon
  - Euamblypygi
    - Charinidae
      - Sarax
      - - Charinus
        - Catageus
    - Neoamblypygi
      - Charontidae
        - Charon
        - Stygophrynus
      - Phrynoidea
        - Phrynidae
          - - Acanthophrynus
            - - Phrynus
              - Paraphrynus
          - Heterophrynus
        - - - ?
              Xerophrynus
          - Phrynichidae
            - Phrynichodamon
            - - Damon
              - - Musicodamon
                - Phrynichinae
                  - Trichodamon
                  - - Phrynichus
                    - Euphrynichus

Recent molecular analysis has refined whipspider phylogeny further. A 2024 paper incorporated genetic data from a newly discovered species within the Paracharontidae (since described as Jorottui). Genomic data was not available prior to this new relict, as the only other living Paleoamblypygid, Paracharon caecus, was last collected in 1899. The new Paleoamblypygid allowed the first molecular phylogeny of the amblypygi, outlined below:

- Amblypygi
  - Paleoamblypygi
    Paracharontidae
  - Euamblypygi
    - Charontoidea
      Charontidae
    - Phrynoidea
      - Phrynichidae
      - Phrynidae
        - Heterophryninae
        - Phryninae

The Authors of the 2024 study concluded that the family Charinidae was a junior synonym of Charontidae. The paper also uncovered several non-monophyletic groupings present within some current genera. For instance, Damon was indicated to be polyphyletic, entangled with Musicodamon and Phrynichodamon, and Phrynus and Heterophrynus were also recovered as polyphyletic.

== As pets ==
Several genera of Amblypygi are sold and kept as pets, including Acanthophrynus, Charinus, Charon, Damon, Euphrynichus, Heterophrynus, Phrynus, Paraphrynus, and Phrynichus. Tailless whip-scorpions live anywhere between 5 and 10 years.

== Genera ==
The following genera are recognised:

- Palaeoamblypygi Weygoldt, 1996
  - Paracharontidae Weygoldt, 1996
    - Paracharon Hansen, 1921 (1 species, West Africa)
    - Jorottui Moreno-González, Gutierrez-Estrada, & Prendini, 2023 (1 species, northern South America)
  - Weygoldtinidae Dunlop, 2018
    - †Weygoldtina Dunlop, 2018 (2 species, Upper Carboniferous Europe, North America)
- Euamblypygi Weygoldt, 1996
  - †Paracharonopsis Engel & Grimaldi, 2014 (1 species, Cambay amber, India, Eocene)
  - Charinidae Weygoldt, 1996
    - Charinus Simon, 1892 (33 species)
    - Sarax Simon, 1892 (10 species)
    - Weygoldtia Miranda, Giupponi, Prendini & Scharff, 2018 (3 species)
  - Neoamblypygi Weygoldt, 1996
    - Charontidae Simon, 1892
      - Catageus Thorell, 1889 (9 species)
      - Charon Karsch, 1879 (5 species)
    - Unidistitarsata Engel & Grimaldi, 2014
      - †Kronocharon Engel & Grimaldi, 2014 (1 species, Burmese amber, Myanmar, Cretaceous)
      - †Burmacharon? Hu et al. 2020 (1 species, Burmese amber, Myanmar, Cretaceous)
      - Phrynoidea Blanchard, 1852
        - Phrynichidae Simon, 1900
          - Damon C. L. Koch, 1850 (10 species)
          - Euphrynichus Weygoldt, 1995 (2 species)
          - Musicodamon Fage, 1939 (1 species)
          - Phrynichodamon Weygoldt, 1996 (1 species)
          - Phrynichus Karsch, 1879 (16 species)
          - Trichodamon Mello-Leitão, 1935 (2 species)
          - Xerophrynus Weygoldt, 1996 (1 species)
        - Phrynidae Blanchard, 1852
          - Acanthophrynus Kraepelin, 1899 (1 species)
          - †Britopygus Dunlop & Martill, 2002 (1 species; Crato Formation, Brazil, Cretaceous)
          - Heterophrynus Pocock, 1894 (14 species)
          - Paraphrynus Moreno, 1940 (18 species)
          - Phrynus Lamarck, 1801 (28 species, Oligocene - Recent)
- Incertae sedis:
  - † Sorellophrynus Harvey, 2002 (1 species, Upper Carboniferous, North America)
  - † Thelyphrynus Petrunkevich, 1913 (1 species, Upper Carboniferous, North America)
