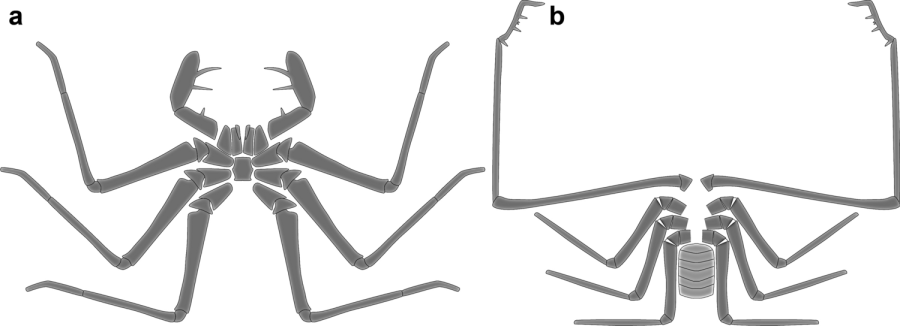
- Simplified representation

Scientific classification
- Domain: Eukaryota
- Kingdom: Animalia
- Phylum: Arthropoda
- Subphylum: Chelicerata
- Class: Arachnida
- Order: Amblypygi
- Family: Phrynidae
- Genus: †Britopygus; Dunlop and Martill, 2002
- Species: †B. weygoldti

Binomial name
- †Britopygus weygoldti Dunlop and Martill, 2002

= Britopygus =

Britopygus Temporal range: Aptian

Extinct genus of arachnids

Britopygus is an extinct genus of whip spider that lived in Brazil (Crato Formation) during the Early Cretaceous epoch.

== Taxonomy ==
The genus is known from a single species, Britopygus weygoldti. Although it bears similarity to members of the extant family Charinidae, its placement in this clade is not beyond dispute and more recent sources place the genus in Phrynidae.
