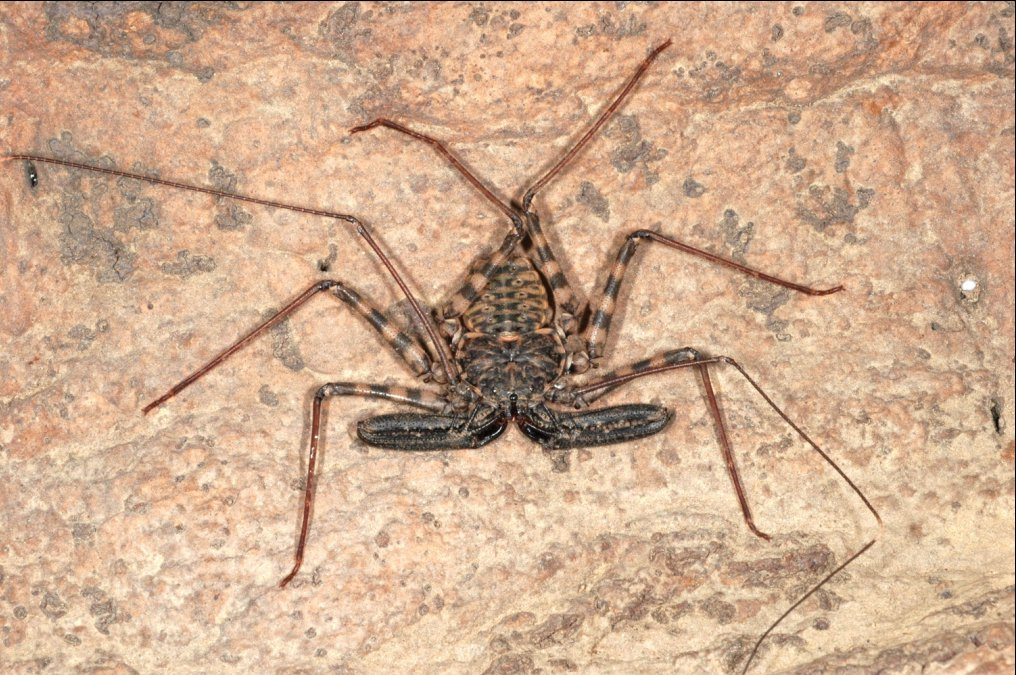

Scientific classification
- Domain: Eukaryota
- Kingdom: Animalia
- Phylum: Arthropoda
- Subphylum: Chelicerata
- Class: Arachnida
- Order: Amblypygi
- Family: Phrynichidae
- Genus: Damon
- Species: D. diadema

Binomial name
- Damon diadema (Simon, 1876)

Subspecies
- Damon diadema diadema (Simon, 1876); Damon diadema robustus Weygoldt, 1999

= Damon diadema =

Species of whip scorpion

Damon diadema is a species of amblypygid, sometimes known as the tailless whip scorpion or giant amblypygid. It is found in Central Africa, Kenya, and Tanzania where it lives in caves, crevices and under fallen logs. The animal is 4–28 mm (0.16–1.10 in) long with a flat body. It is known as a tailless whipscorpion because of the long whip-legs that are the majority of its body width. Its legspan is about 20 cm (7.9 in).

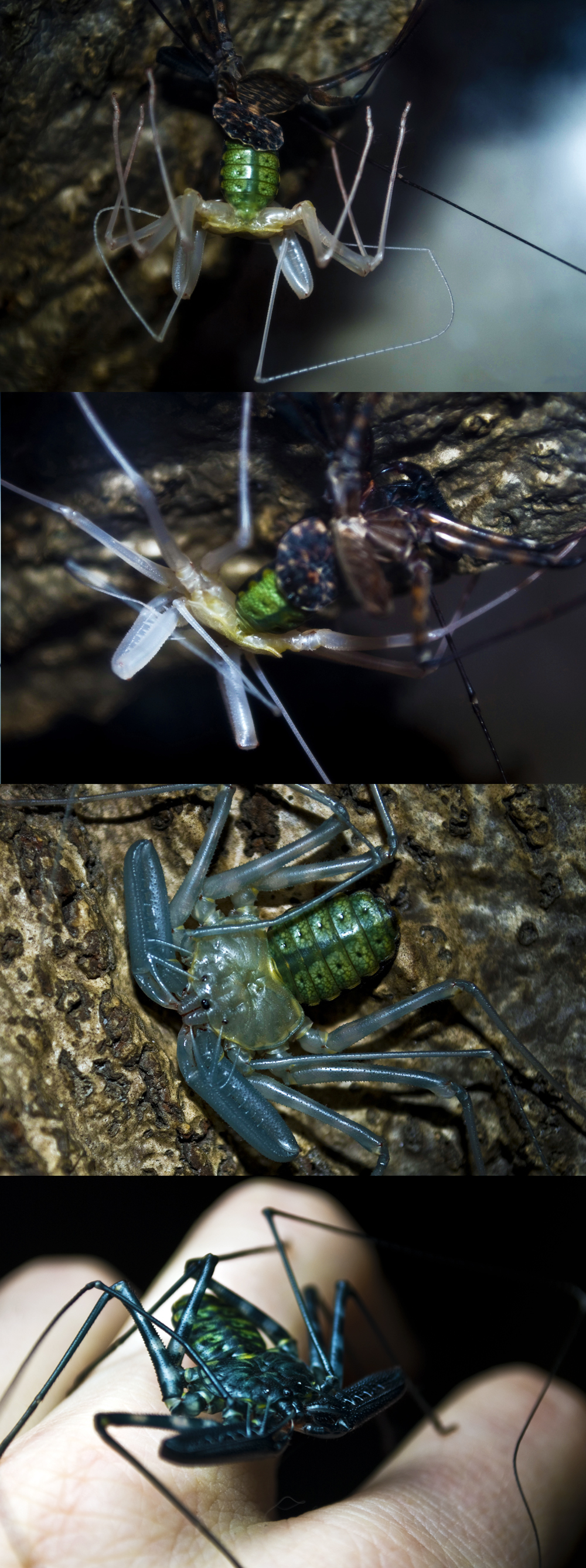
Molting process of a Damon diadema

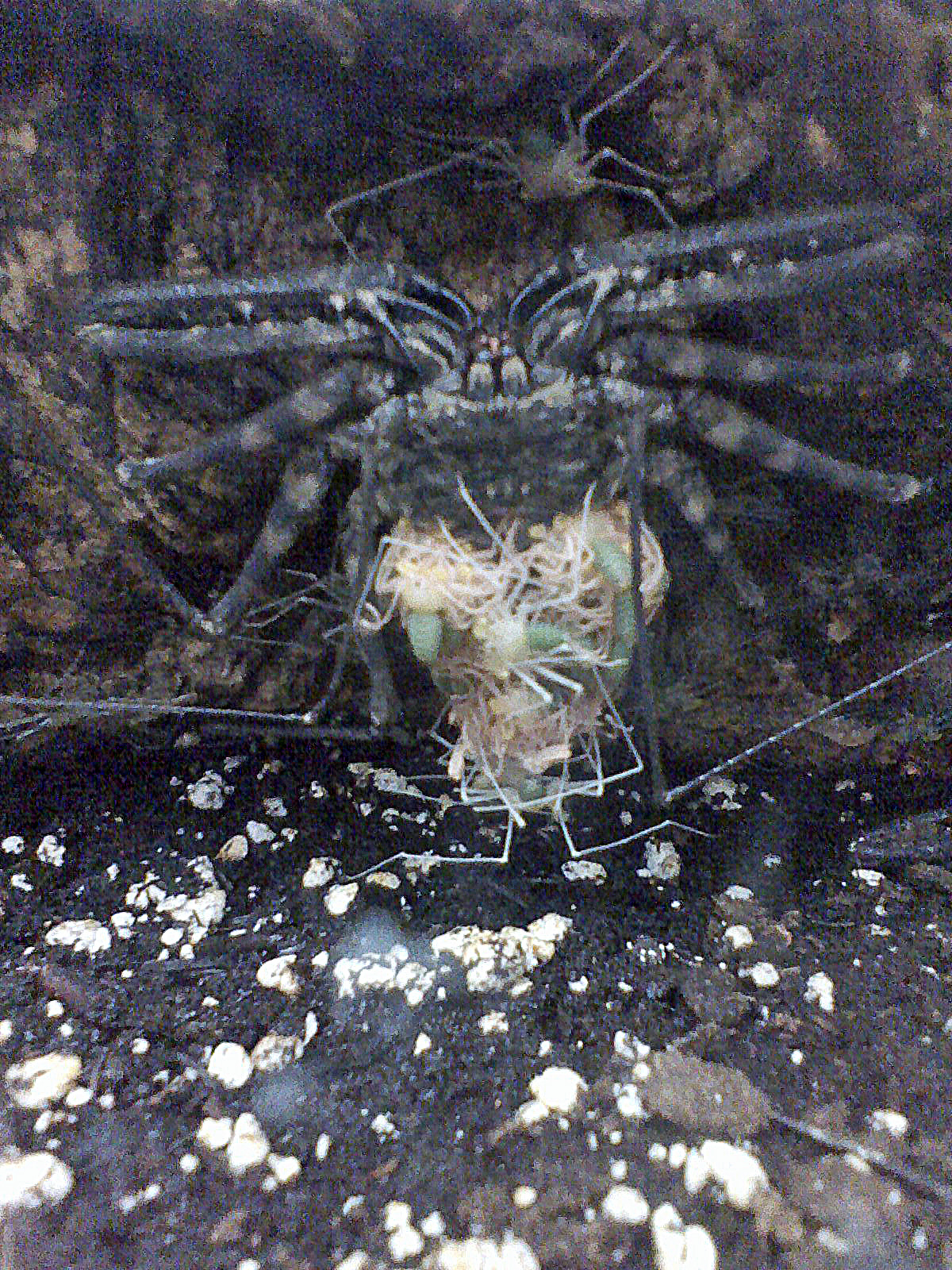
Damon diadema mother carrying young
