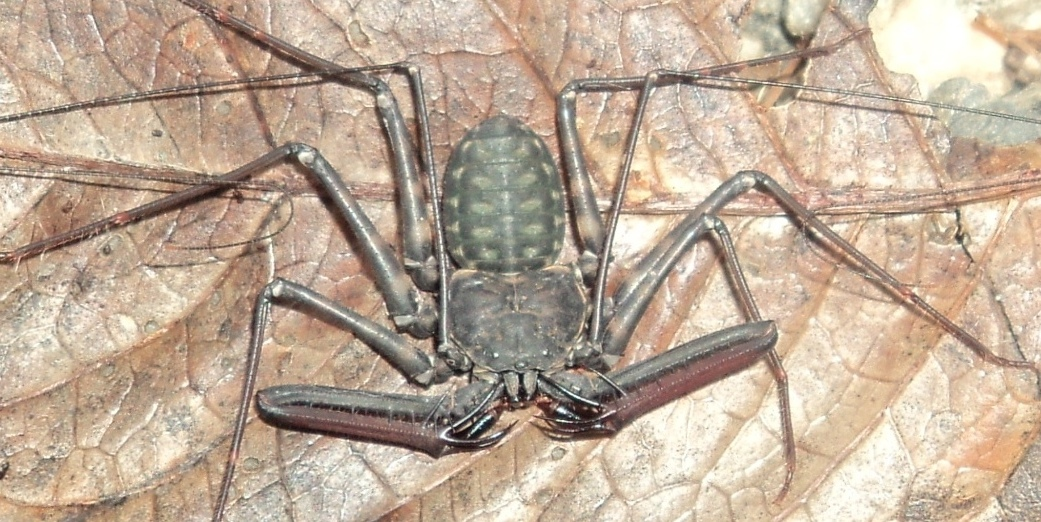
- Trichodamon princeps

Scientific classification
- Kingdom: Animalia
- Phylum: Arthropoda
- Subphylum: Chelicerata
- Class: Arachnida
- Order: Amblypygi
- Family: Phrynichidae
- Genus: Trichodamon; Mello-Leitão, 1935
- Species: T. princeps

Binomial name
- Trichodamon princeps Mello-Leitão, 1935

= Trichodamon =

Genus of arachnid

Trichodamon is a genus of whipspider from Brazil, containing a single species, Trichodamon princeps.

== Taxonomy ==
Before 2018, Trichodamon contained two species, T. princeps and T. froesi, described by Mello-Leitão in 1935 and 1940 respectively, with a third species T. pusillus previously synonymized to T. princeps. However, a paper published in 2018 concluded that the characters that were previously used to distinguish the two species were unreliable, and that Trichodamon is in fact monotypic.

== Distribution and habitat ==
Trichodamon is the only known phrynichid amblypygid found within the Americas. It is distributed within Brazil.
