= Phrynichus (arachnid) =

Scientific classification
- Domain: Eukaryota
- Kingdom: Animalia
- Phylum: Arthropoda
- Subphylum: Chelicerata
- Class: Arachnida
- Order: Amblypygi
- Family: Phrynichidae
- Genus: Phrynichus; Karsch, 1879

Genus of amblypygi

Phrynichus is a genus of tailless whipscorpions in the family Phrynichidae. There are about 16 described species in Phrynichus.

== Species ==
These 17 species belong to the genus Phrynichus:

- Phrynichus brevispinatus Weygoldt, 1998^{i c g}
- Phrynichus ceylonicus (C. L. Koch, 1843)^{i c g}
- Phrynichus deflersi Simon, 1887^{i c g}
- Phrynichus dhofarensis Weygoldt, Pohl and Polak, 2002^{i c g}
- Phrynichus exophthalmus Whittick, 1940^{i c g}
- Phrynichus gaucheri Weygoldt, 1998^{i c g}
- Phrynichus heurtaultae Weygoldt, Pohl and Polak, 2002^{i c g}
- Phrynichus jayakari Pocock, 1894^{i c g}
- Phrynichus longespina (Simon, 1936)^{i c g}
- Phrynichus madagascariensis Weygoldt, 1998^{i c g}
- Phrynichus nigrimanus (C. L. Koch, 1847)^{i c g}
- Phrynichus orientalis Weygoldt, 1998^{i c g}
- Phrynichus phipsoni Pocock, 1894^{i c g}
- Phrynichus pusillus Pocock, 1894^{i c g}
- Phrynichus scaber (Gervais, 1844)^{i c g}
- Phrynichus spinitarsus Karsch, 1879^{i c g}
- Phrynichus persicus, Miranda and Zamani, 2018)

Data sources: i = ITIS, c = Catalogue of Life, g = GBIF, b = Bugguide.net
