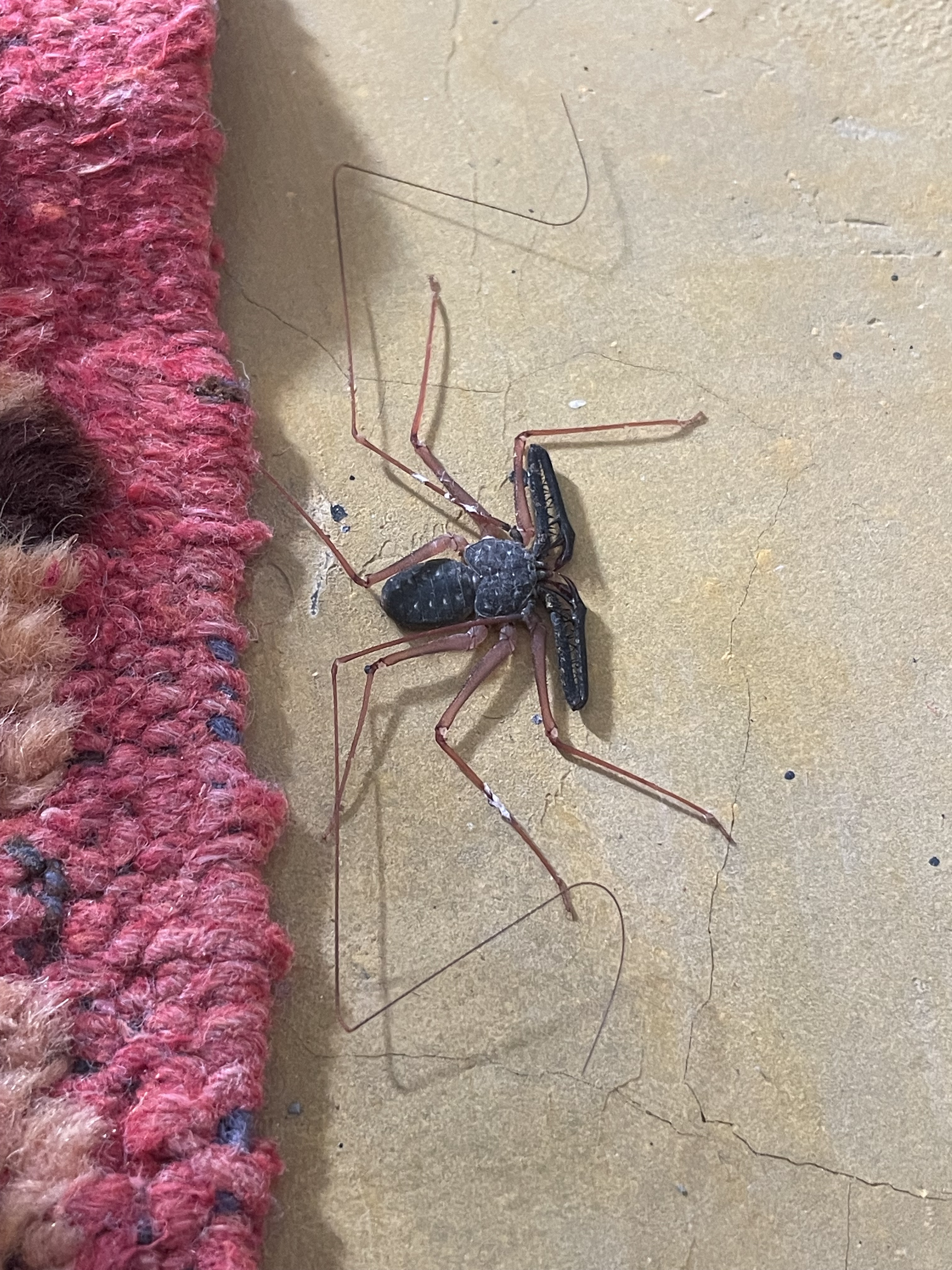

Scientific classification
- Kingdom: Animalia
- Phylum: Arthropoda
- Subphylum: Chelicerata
- Class: Arachnida
- Order: Amblypygi
- Family: Phrynichidae
- Genus: Musicodamon; Fage, 1939
- Species: M. atlanteus

Binomial name
- Musicodamon atlanteus Fage, 1939

= Musicodamon =

Genus of arachnid

Musicodamon is a genus of amblypygid (whipspider) in the family Phrynichidae. It contains a single species, Musicodamon atlanteus.

== Description ==
Musicodamon atlanteus is a large amblypygid. It has only slight sexual dimorphism at most, according to specimens examined for a 2002 study.

== Behavior ==
The behavior of Musicodamon atlanteus is unusual among amblypygi, with reduced courtship behavior and an unusual method of fighting other individuals.

=== Courtship ===
Observed courtship in the previously mentioned 2002 study lasted only minutes, compared to the often hours long courtship in other species. Additionally, male M. atlanteus do not coordinate with the movements of the courted females, in contrast to the precise coordination of other species. Males also do not attempt to lure females towards the deposited spermatophore.

=== Fighting ===
In most amblypygi, individuals use their pedipalps in nonlethal contests of strength, after tapping one another with their antenniform legs. In M. atlanteus, however, the tapping phase is prolonged, and the third pair of legs are used as weapons rather than the pedipalps. Fights were never observed to escalate to greater levels of violence.

== Distribution and habitat ==
Musicodamon atlanteus is found in Morocco and Algeria. It typically lives within caves and rock fissures. Despite being found in arid locations, M. atlanteus may retreat into microhabitats that are more humid. The species is sometimes found in human homes. It may be threatened by human activity, such as expansion of agriculture and river modification.
