= Hygroreception =

Ability to sense changes in environmental moisture and humidity

Hygroreception is the ability to detect changes in the moisture and humidity content of an environment. It is a sense that is not present in humans. Many insects have this sense which has been studied using the cockroach and stick insect. The structure responsible for this sense is a hygroreceptor. In a study conducted upon nematodes, both thermal and mechanical neural pathways are required in order for a specimen to react to humidity. This supports the theory that hygroreception is a result of thermal and mechanical stimuli.
