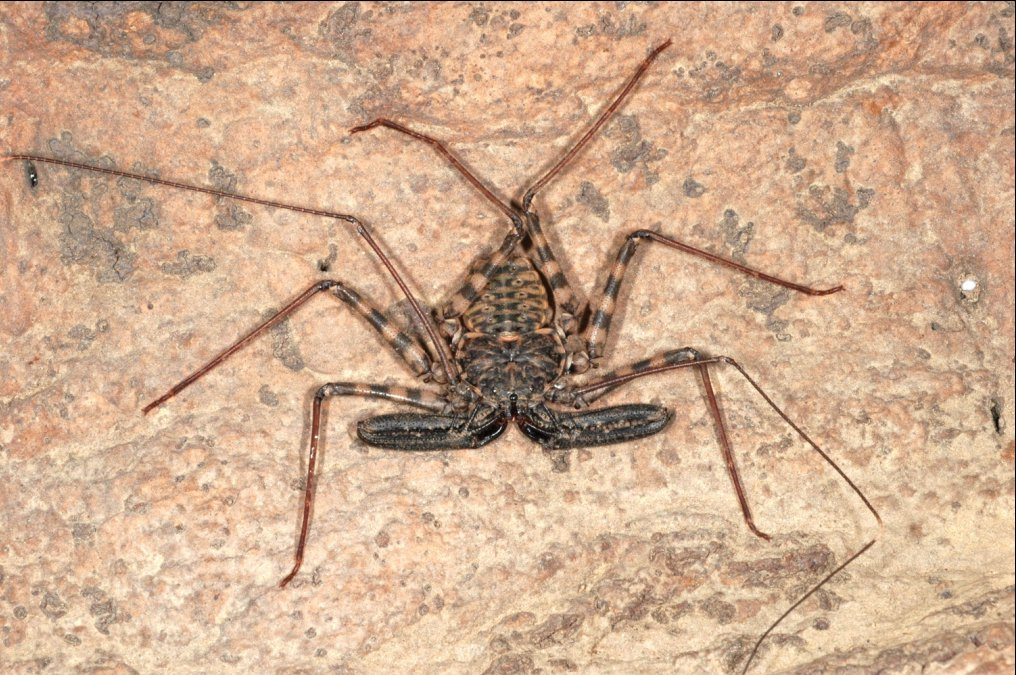
- Damon diadema

Scientific classification
- Kingdom: Animalia
- Phylum: Arthropoda
- Subphylum: Chelicerata
- Class: Arachnida
- Order: Amblypygi
- Family: Phrynichidae
- Genus: Damon; C. L. Koch, 1850

= Damon (arachnid) =

Genus of arachnids

Damon is a genus of whip spiders, also known as tailless whip scorpions (Amblypygi) of the family Phrynichidae.

== Species ==
- Damon annulatipes (Wood, 1869)
- Damon australis (Simon, 1886)
- Damon brachialis Weygoldt, 1999
- Damon diadema (Simon, 1876)
- Damon gracilis Weygoldt, 1998
- Damon johnstonii (Pocock, 1894)
- Damon longispinatus Weygoldt, 1999
- Damon medius (Herbst, 1797)
- Damon sylviae Prendini, Weygoldt & Wheeler, 2005
- Damon tibialis (Simon, 1876)
- Damon uncinatus Weygoldt, 1999
- Damon variegatus C. L. Koch, 1850
