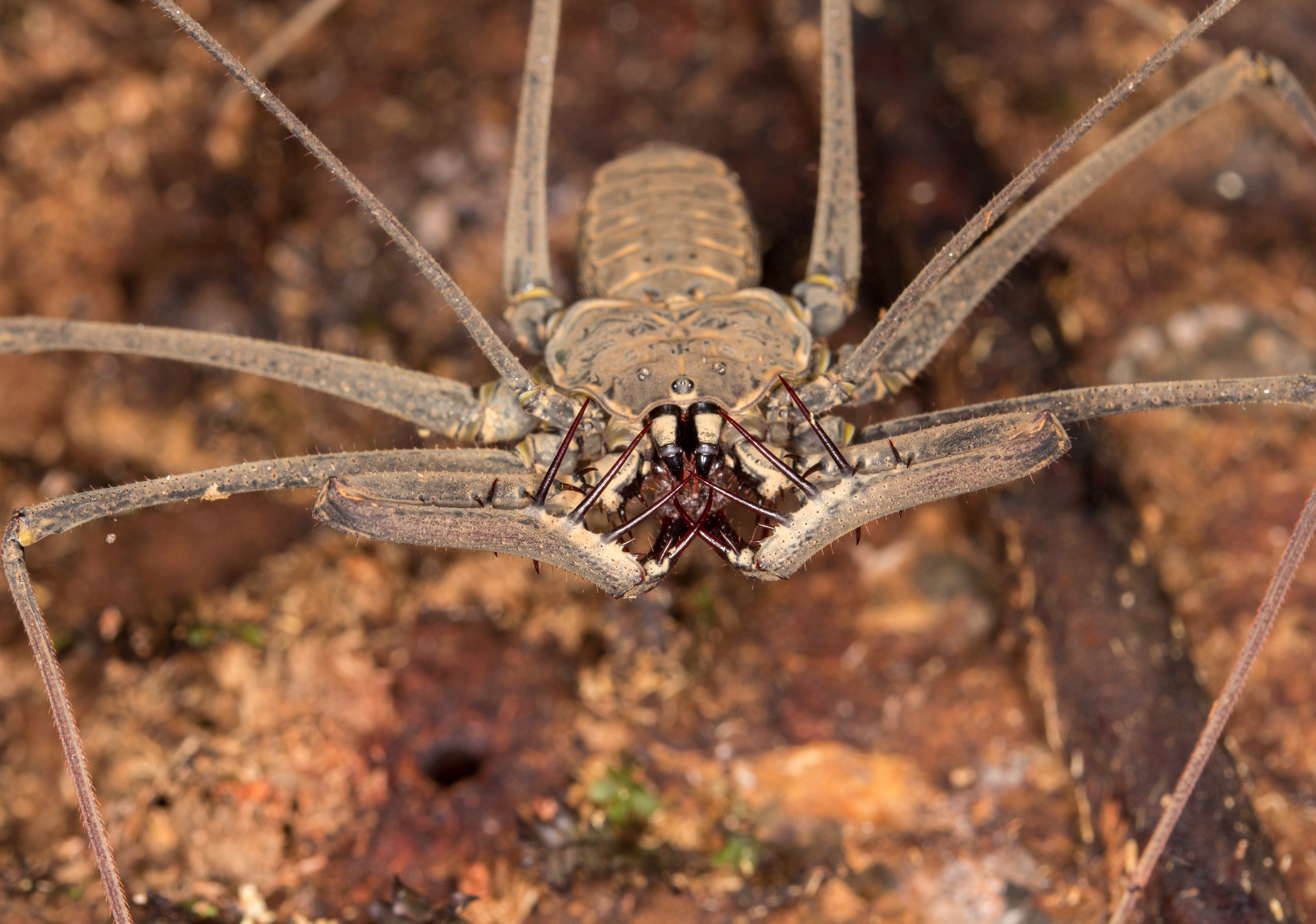
- Indeterminate species of Heterophrynus from Ecuador

Scientific classification
- Kingdom: Animalia
- Phylum: Arthropoda
- Subphylum: Chelicerata
- Class: Arachnida
- Order: Amblypygi
- Family: Phrynidae
- Subfamily: Heterophryninae
- Genus: Heterophrynus; Pocock, 1894

Type species
- Heterophrynus cheiracanthus (Gervais, 1842)

= Heterophrynus =

Genus of whip scorpions

Heterophrynus is a genus of whip spiders, also known as tailless whip scorpions (order Amblypygi), of the family Phrynidae, in the monotypic subfamily Heterophryninae.

== Species ==
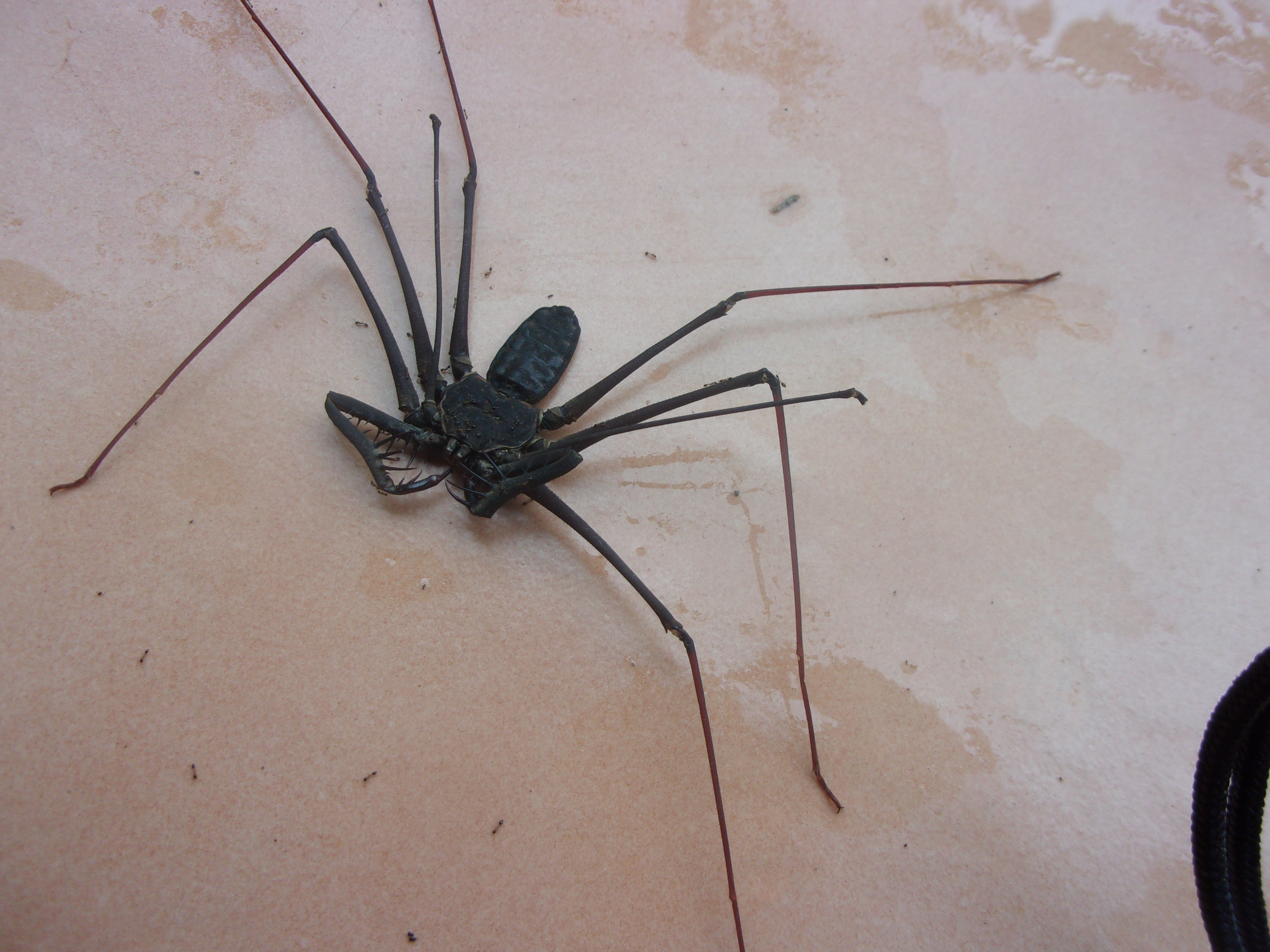
Heterophrynus alces, Kourou, French Guiana

There are 17 species:

- Heterophrynus alces Pocock, 1902
- Heterophrynus armiger Pocock, 1902
- Heterophrynus awa Chirivi-Joya, Moreno-González & Fagua, 2020
- Heterophrynus batesii (Butler, 1873)
- Heterophrynus boterorum Giupponi & Kury, 2013
- Heterophrynus caribensis Armas, Torres-Contreras & Alvarez Garcia, 2015
- Heterophrynus cervinus Pocock, 1894
- Heterophrynus cheiracanthus (Gervais, 1842), type species
- Heterophrynus elaphus Pocock, 1903
- Heterophrynus gorgo (Wood, 1869)
- Heterophrynus guacharo de Armas, 2015
- Heterophrynus longicornis (Butler, 1873)
- Heterophrynus pumilio C.L. Koch, 1840
- Heterophrynus seriatus Mello-Leitão, 1940
- Heterophrynus silviae Giupponi & Kury, 2013
- Heterophrynus vesanicus Mello-Leitão, 1931
- Heterophrynus yarigui Alvarez Garcia, de Armas & Diaz Perez, 2015
