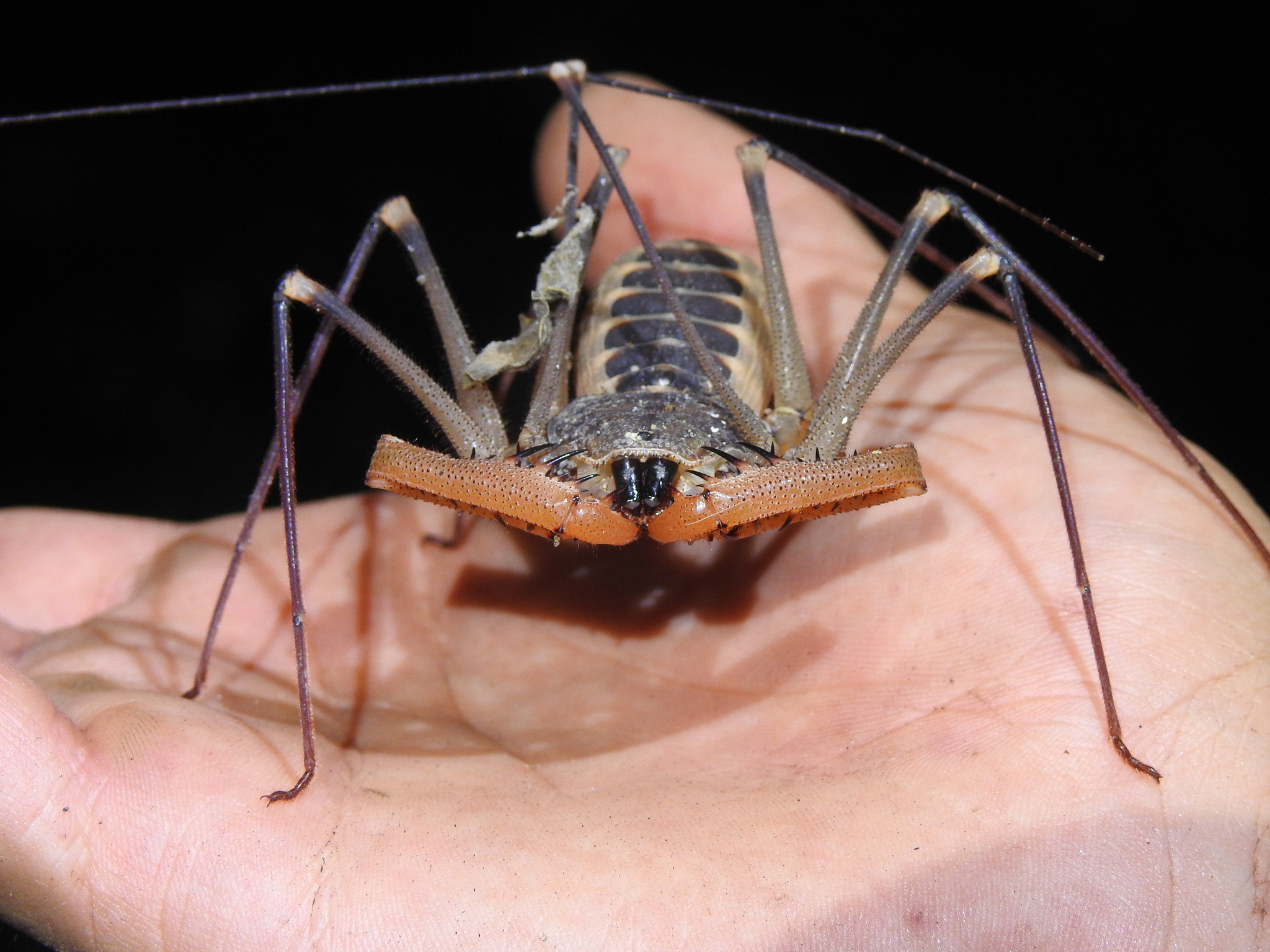

Scientific classification
- Kingdom: Animalia
- Phylum: Arthropoda
- Subphylum: Chelicerata
- Class: Arachnida
- Order: Amblypygi
- Family: Phrynidae
- Genus: Acanthophrynus; Kraepelin, 1899
- Species: A. coronatus

Binomial name
- Acanthophrynus coronatus (Butler, 1873)
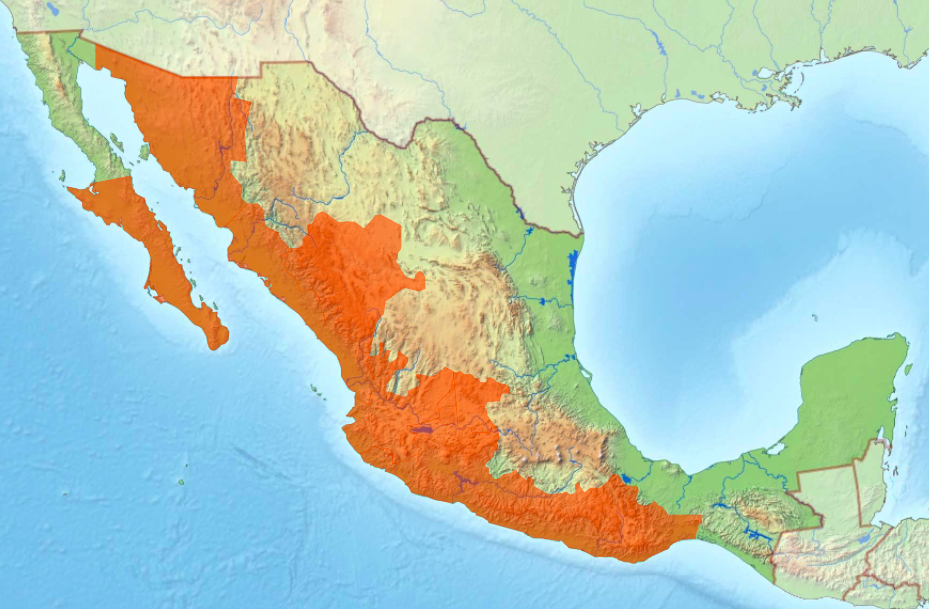
- A. coronatus range by state (range in Sonora is limited to the south of the state)

= Acanthophrynus =

Genus of amblypygi

Acanthophrynus is a genus of tailless whipscorpion in the family Phrynidae containing a single species, Acanthophrynus coronatus. This species is sometimes kept as a pet.

== Taxonomy ==
Acanthophrynus coronatus was first described by Arthur Gardiner Butler in 1873 under the name Phrynus coronatus. A new genus was later described for the species by Kraepelin in 1899. Genetic comparison of populations of A. coronatus suggests that the species may actually represent more than one clade, with genetic divergence equivalent to that between different species in other genera.

== Description ==
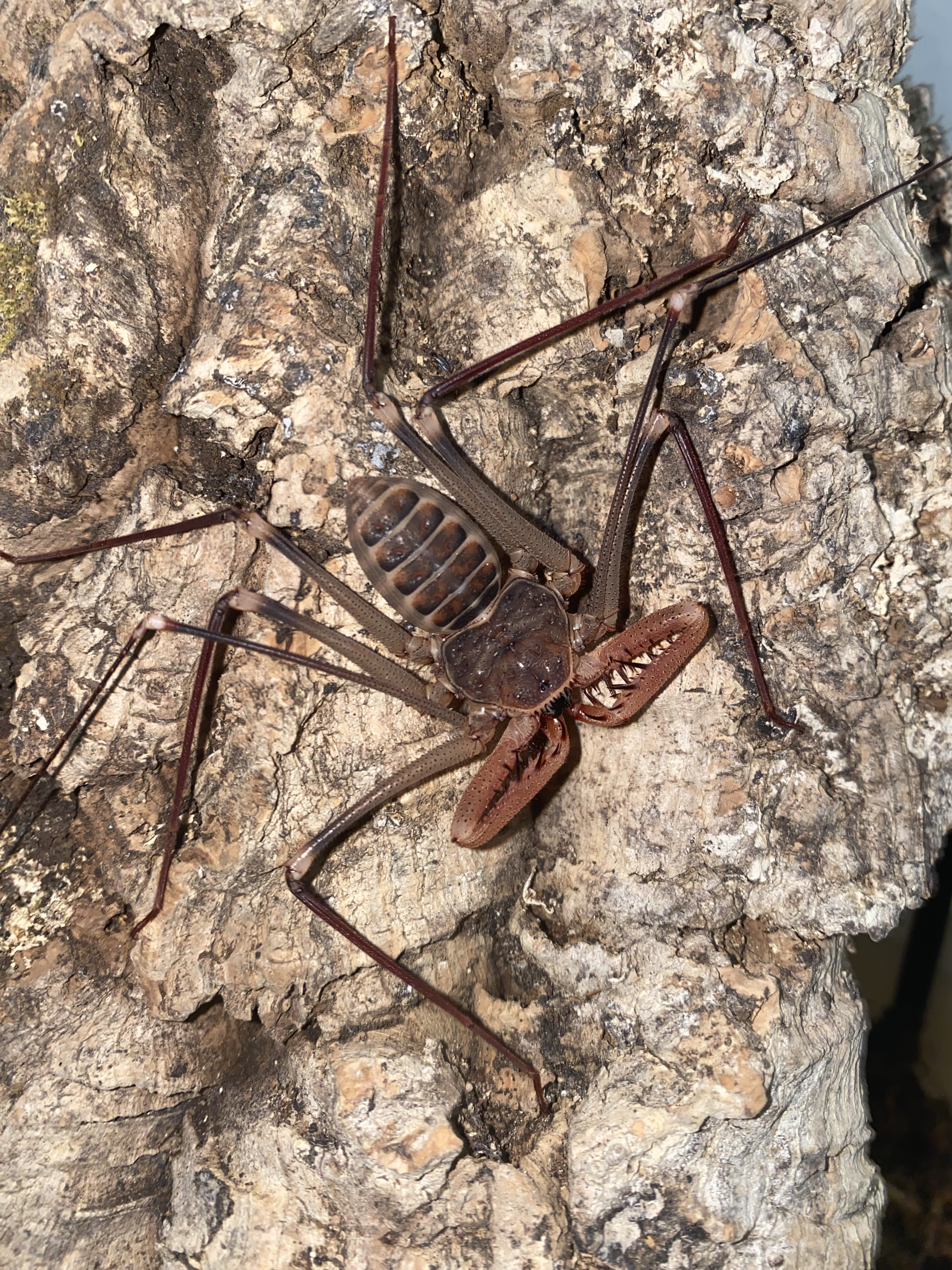
Male Acanthophrynus coronatus in captivity

Acanthophrynus coronatus is a very large amblypygid, with a body length of up to 45mm. They have light red pedipalps, and a light brown to brown prosoma, the opisthosoma being of the same color with some darker brown stripping. All of the legs are a lighter brown than the prosoma, reaching almost a yellow color. A. coronatus is one of a few whipspider species capable of stridulation when threatened, rubbing its chelicerae together to produce an audible hiss.

== Distribution and habitat ==
Acanthophrynus coronatus is found in Mexico, inhabiting deciduous tropical forests of the Pacific coastal region from southern Sonora to Oaxaca, including Baja California, at elevations between 0 and 1900m above sea level, though its rare they surpass 1500m. The average annual temperature in these regions are 20 to 29 °C, with average rainfall between 300mm and 1800mm, this of course depending on the region.

== Behavior ==
This species, like all in the family Phrynidae, is nocturnal, remaining mostly in hiding during the day; they are mostly tree dwelling, and will rarely be seen on the ground. When kept as pets, they are best kept solitary, although they have some tolerance for those of the same egg sack. Pairs can also be kept together for multiple days, but this of course comes with risks.
