= Phrynichodamon =

Scientific classification
- Kingdom: Animalia
- Phylum: Arthropoda
- Subphylum: Chelicerata
- Class: Arachnida
- Order: Amblypygi
- Family: Phrynichidae
- Genus: Phrynichodamon; Weygoldt, 1996
- Species: P. scullyi

Binomial name
- Phrynichodamon scullyi (Purcell, 1902)

Synonyms
- Phrynichus scullyi Purcell, 1901

Monotypic genus of arachnid

Phrynichodamon is a monotypic genus of whipspider in the family Phrynichidae, containing only the species Phrynichodamon scullyi.

== Distribution ==
Phrynichodamon scullyi is distributed within southwestern Namibia and western South Africa. The species has only been recorded as single specimens from four localities in Namibia, with most known records being two separate populations in South Africa. Genetic comparison to assess whether P. scullyi is truly a single species may be needed due to the separation of recorded populations.
