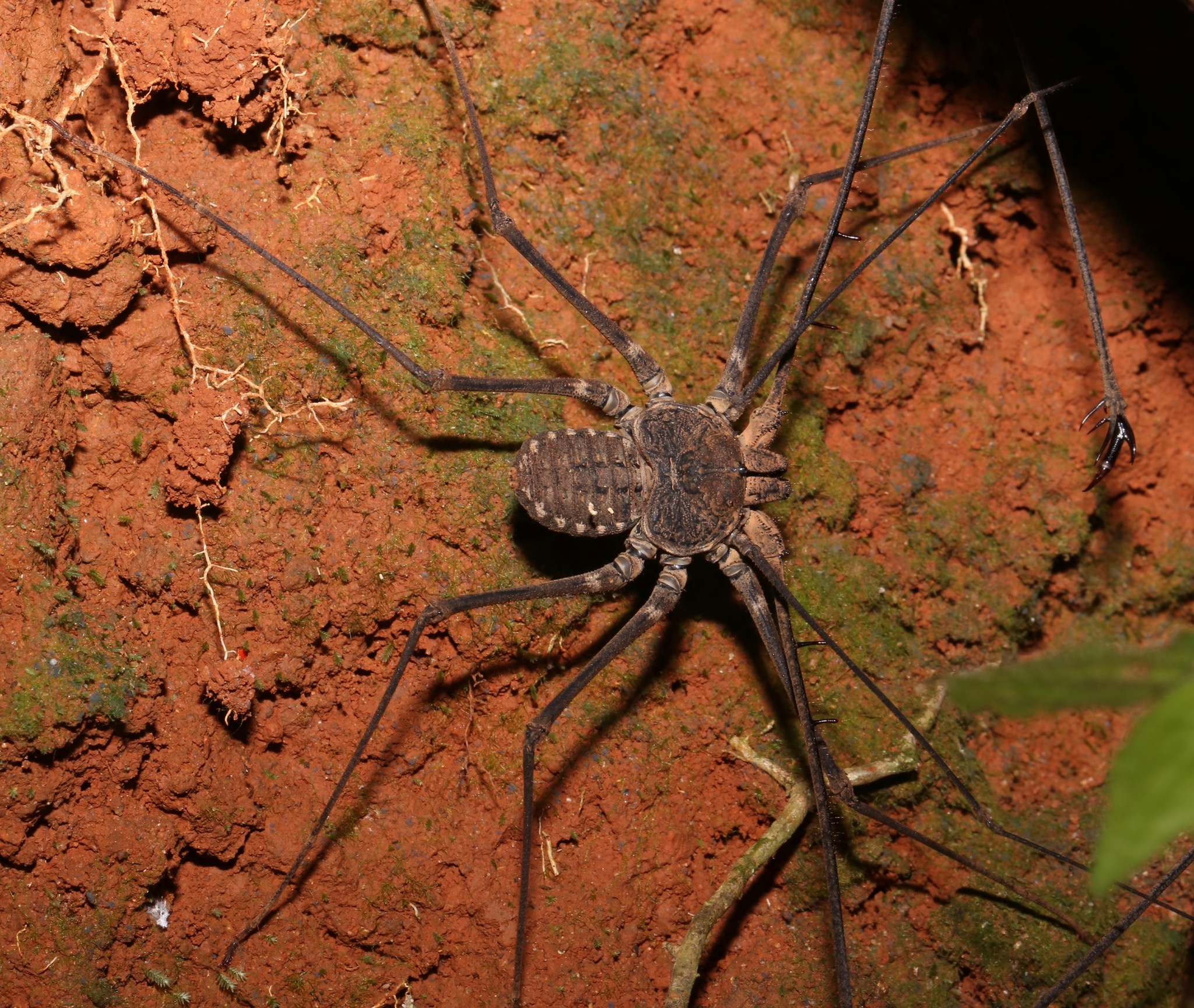
- Euphrynichus amanica

Scientific classification
- Kingdom: Animalia
- Phylum: Arthropoda
- Subphylum: Chelicerata
- Class: Arachnida
- Order: Amblypygi
- Family: Phrynichidae
- Genus: Euphrynichus; Weygoldt, 1995

Species
- E. amanica (Werner, 1936); E. bacilifer (Gerstaecker, 1873)

= Euphrynichus =

Genus of arachnids

Euphrynichus is a genus of amblypygi (also known as whipspiders) in the family Phrynichidae.

== Description ==
Euphrynichus are large amblypygi, with body lengths up to 36mm (1.42in), and very long pedipalps with tibia up to 85mm (3.35in) long.

== Taxonomy ==
The genus currently contains two species:

- Euphrynichus amanica (Werner, 1936)
- Euphrynichus bacilifer (Gerstaecker, 1873)
