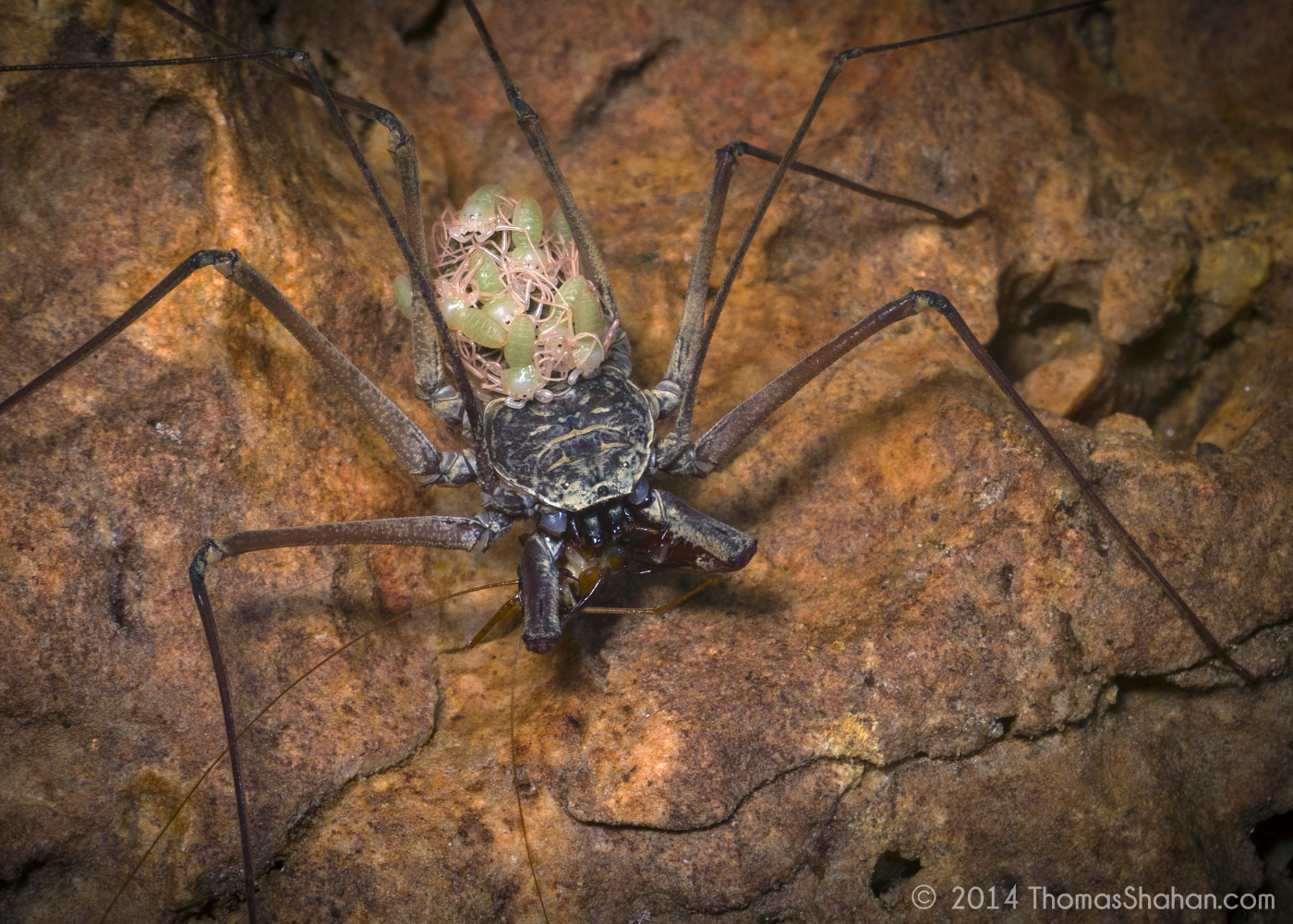
- Paraphrynus spp. with her young in Belize

Scientific classification
- Kingdom: Animalia
- Phylum: Arthropoda
- Subphylum: Chelicerata
- Class: Arachnida
- Order: Amblypygi
- Family: Phrynidae; Thorell, 1883

Genera
- 6, see text

= Phrynidae =

Phrynidae Temporal range: Cretaceous–Recent

Family of whipspiders

Phrynidae is a family of amblypygid arachnida arthropods also known as whip spiders and tailless whip scorpions. Phrynidae species are found in tropical and subtropical regions in North and South America. Some species are subterranean; all are nocturnal. At least some species of Phrynidae hold territories that they defend from other individuals.

== Taxonomy ==
The following genera are recognised:

Phrynidae Blanchard, 1852

- Acanthophrynus Kraepelin, 1899 (1 species)
- †Britopygus Dunlop & Martill, 2002 (1 species; Crato Formation, Brazil, Early Cretaceous (Aptian))
- †Electrophrynus Petrunkevich, 1971 Chiapas amber, Mexico, Miocene (nomen dubium)
- Heterophrynus Pocock, 1894 (17 species)
- Paraphrynus Moreno, 1940 (18 species)
- Phrynus Lamarck, 1801 (28 species, Oligocene - Recent)
