= Pulvilli =

Insect morphology

- 2 refers to the pulvilus on the tarsus of a fly

Details
- Precursor: Limb appendage specialization in insects
- Part of: Insect leg (tarsus)
- System: Musculoskeletal system (arthropods)
- Location: Beneath the tarsal claws in many insects
- Function: Adhesion to smooth surfaces; locomotion aid

Identifiers
- Latin: pulvillus (plural: pulvilli)

Pulvilli are paired, soft, cushion-like adhesive lobes located on the pretarsus of many insects, particularly in Diptera such as the housefly. They are positioned on the ventral side of the tarsal apex, typically beneath or between the (claws) ungues, and function in surface adhesion during locomotion by increasing contact area and facilitating attachment through fine setal structures and associated secretions. The pulvilli function as an adhesive system. Their sticking power comes partly from Van der Waals force, and partly from an adhesive fluid secreted from the extremities onto surfaces.
