= Peter Weygoldt =

German biologist and arachnologist

- Born: 24 April 1933; Wilhelmshaven
- Died: 23 October 2021 (aged 88)
- Occupation: German biologist

Peter Johann Hennig Weygoldt (April 24, 1933 – October, 23 2021) was a German biologist specialising in arachnology and herpetology.

== Biography ==
Weygoldt was born April 24, 1933 in Wilhelmshaven to Walter Weygoldt and Hanna Weygoldt (née Wien-holz). Due to his father's military career he grew up moving between places including Bremen and Berlin in Germany and Kolberg in Poland, and changed schools over ten times. His father died 1943 in Riga while serving as a lieutenant colonel during World War II. He studied biology at the Christian-Albrechts-University in Kiel for six years from 1952, including one year at the Albert-Ludwigs-University in Freiburg. He obtained his doctorate in early 1958 before moving into research. He was working in Beaufort, North Carolina in 1966 when he met Sylvia Möhring who had an interest in wildlife and they married just a couple of months later. They moved to Freiburg in 1967 where Weygoldt worked as a senior assistant in the University of Freiburg before being made an adjunct professor in December 1978.

Although his work focused on Uropygi (whip scorpions), Amblypygi (whip spiders) and Pseudoscorpions, he also had an interest in frogs found in the tropics. He published in academic journals as well as his work being found in scientific films and books.

Weygoldt was known for studies of arachnid phylogeny including a seminal work that provided a scheme for arachnid inter-ordinal relationships.

He retired in September 1995, but continued his research for many years with his last publication in 2013 on sperm transfer and maternal brood care in flagellate scorpions.

In 2013 he received the Simon Award from the International Society of Arachnology for his life's work.

When he died in 2021 he was survived by his wife and their two daughters and two sons.
