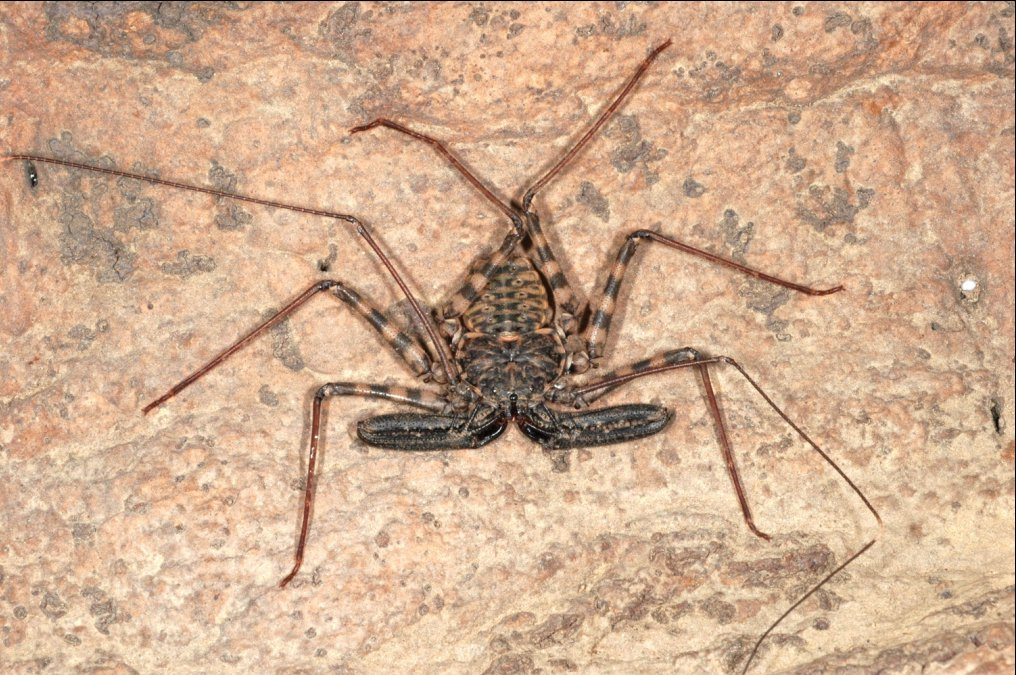
- Damon diadema

Scientific classification
- Kingdom: Animalia
- Phylum: Arthropoda
- Subphylum: Chelicerata
- Class: Arachnida
- Order: Amblypygi
- Family: Phrynichidae; Eugène Simon, 1892

= Phrynichidae =

Family of tailless whip scorpions

Phrynichidae is a family of arachnids within the order Amblypygi, also known as whip-spiders or tailless whip-scorpions.

== Distribution ==
The species of this family are found in Africa, South Asia and South America.

== Genera ==
- Damoninae Simon, in Fage & Simon 1936
  - Damon C. L. Koch, 1850
  - Musicodamon Fage, 1939
  - Phrynichodamon Weygoldt, 1996
- Phrynichinae Simon, 1892
  - Euphrynichus Weygoldt, 1995
  - Phrynichus Karsch, 1879
  - Trichodamon Mello-Leitao, 1935
- indefinite subfamily
  - Xerophrynus Weygoldt, 1996
