= List of fauna of Batu Caves =

The following species have been collected from the Dark Cave, Batu Caves, Selangor in Malaysia:

- Pheretima indica (Haplotaxida: Megascolecidae)
- Dichogaster sp. (Haplotaxida: Octochaetidae)
- Dichogaster bolavi (Haplotaxida: Octochaetidae)
- Sarax brachydactylus (Amblypygi: Tarantulidae)
- Damarchus cavernicolus (Araneae: Ctenizidae)
- Heteropoda robusta (Araneae: Heteropodidae)
- Liphistius batuensis (Araneae: Liphistiidae)
- Psiloderces crinitus (Araneae: Ochyroceratidae)
- Spermophora miser (Araneae: Pholcidae)
- Psechrus curvipalpus (Araneae: Psechridae)
- Scytodes magnus (Araneae: Scytodidae)
- Theriheridion rufipes (Araneae: Theridiidae)
- Uloborus spelaeus (Araneae: Uloboridae)
- Paracheyletia sp. (Eleutherengona: Cheyletidae)
- Ornithodorus bauensis (Ixodida: Argasidae)
- Belba sp. (Oribatida: Belbidae)
- Galumna sp. (Oribatida: Galumnidae)
- Vaghia sp. (Oribatida: Galumnidae)
- Scheloribates exuvium (Oribatida: Oribatulidae)
- Scheloribates sp. (Oribatida: Oribatulidae)
- Trombicula batui (Parasitengona: Trombiculidae)
- Trombicula insolli (Parasitengona: Trombiculidae)
- Cryptocheiridium lucifugum (Pseudoscorpionida: Ideoroncidae)
- Dhanus sumatranus (Pseudoscorpionida: Ideoroncidae)
- Dhanus doveri (Pseudoscorpionida: Ideoroncidae)
- Cunaxa setirostris (Trombidiformes: Cunaxidae)
- Scutigera decipiens (Scutigeromorpha: Cambalidae)
- Glyphiulus sp. (Sphaerotheriida: Cambalidae)
- Doratodesmus sp. (Sphaerotheriida: Cambalidae)
- Brachystomella contorta (Collembola: Brachystomellidae)
- Cunaxa spp. (Collembola: Cunaxidae)
- Willemia nadchatrami (Collembola: Neogastruridae)
- Aderus mcclurei (Coleoptera: Aderidae)
- Euglenes batuensis (Coleoptera: Aderidae)
- Euglenes cephalicus (Coleoptera: Aderidae)
- Euglenes malayanus (Coleoptera: Aderidae)
- Euglenes troglodytes (Coleoptera: Aderidae)
- Unidentified (Coleoptera: Carabidae)
- Unidentified (Coleoptera: Curculionidae)
- Aethriostoma undulata (Coleoptera: Dermestidae)
- Trinodes sp. (Coleoptera: Dermestidae)
- Cardiophorus carduelis (Coleoptera: Elateridae)
- Melanoxanthus near dohrni (Coleoptera: Elateridae)
- Platynuchus sp. (Coleoptera: Elateridae)
- Unidentified (Coleoptera: Endomychidae)
- Platycladoxena near angulosa (Coleoptera: Erotylidae)
- Thallisellodes limbooliati (Coleoptera: Erotylidae)
- Cercyon gebieni (Coleoptera: Hydrophilidae)
- Dactylosternum abdominale (Coleoptera: Hydrophilidae)
- Lychnocrepis antricola (Coleoptera: Lampyridae)
- Unidentified (Coleoptera: Melyridae)
- Unidentified (Coleoptera: Nitidulidae)
- Unidentified (Coleoptera: Orthoperidae)
- Unidentified (Coleoptera: Pselaphidae)
- Trox costatus (Coleoptera: Scarabaeidae)
- Unidentified (Coleoptera: Scydmaenidae)
- Unidentified (Coleoptera: Silphidae)
- Unidentified (Coleoptera: Staphylinidae)
- Coeloecetes cavernicola (Coleoptera: Tenebrionidae)
- Chelisoches morio (Dermaptera: Forficulidae)
- Chelisoches brevipennis (Dermaptera: Forficulidae)
- Unidentified (Diptera: Cecidomyiidae)
- Atrichopogon jacobsoni (Diptera: Ceratopogonidae)
- Culicoides huffi (Diptera: Ceratopogonidae)
- Culicoides peregrinus (Diptera: Ceratopogonidae)
- Culicoides prob. arakawai (Diptera: Ceratopogonidae)
- Forcipomyia spp. (Diptera: Ceratopogonidae)
- Stilobezzia sp. (Diptera: Ceratopogonidae)
- Eusmittia cavernae (Diptera: Chironomidae)
- Paratendipes inarmatus (Diptera: Chironomidae)
- Pentaneura batuensis (Diptera: Chironomidae)
- Podonomus sp. (Diptera: Chironomidae)
- Tricimba batucola (Diptera: Chloropidae)
- Chyromya prob. dubia (Diptera: Chyromyidae)
- Gymnochiromyia sp. (Diptera: Chyromyidae)
- Aedes albopictus (Diptera: Culicidae)
- Culex tritaeniorhynchus (Diptera: Culicidae)
- Uranotaenia sp. (Diptera: Culicidae)
- Condylostylus sp. (Diptera: Dolichopodidae)
- Drosophila ananassae (Diptera: Drosophilidae)
- Drosophila melanogaster (Diptera: Drosophilidae)
- Desmometopa spp. (Diptera: Milichiidae)
- Leptometopa mcclurei (Diptera: Milichiidae)
- Milichia sp. (Diptera: Milichiidae)
- Phyllomyza cavernae (Diptera: Milichiidae)
- Fannia leucosticta (Diptera: Muscidae)
- Ophyra chalcogaster (Diptera: Muscidae)
- Chetoneura cavernae (Diptera: Mycetophilidae)
- Eucampsipoda sundaicum (Diptera: Nycteribiidae)
- Nycteribosca prob. gigantea (Diptera: Nycteribiidae)
- Diploneura peregrina (Diptera: Phoridae)
- Brunettia sp. (Diptera: Psychodidae)
- Phlebotomus anodontis (Diptera: Psychodidae)
- Phlebotomus anondontis (Diptera: Psychodidae)
- Phlebotomus argentipes (Diptera: Psychodidae)
- Phlebotomus asperules (Diptera: Psychodidae)
- Phlebotomus lutea (Diptera: Psychodidae)
- Phlebotomus makati (Diptera: Psychodidae)
- Phlebotomus malayica (Diptera: Psychodidae)
- Phlebotomus savaiiensis (Diptera: Psychodidae)
- Phlebotomus stantion (Diptera: Psychodidae)
- Psychoda acanthostyla (Diptera: Psychodidae)
- Psychoda alternata (Diptera: Psychodidae)
- Psychoda aponesos (Diptera: Psychodidae)
- Psychoda harrisi (Diptera: Psychodidae)
- Psychoda malleola (Diptera: Psychodidae)
- Psychoda pellucida (Diptera: Psychodidae)
- Psychoda vagabunda (Diptera: Psychodidae)
- Sycorax malayensis (Diptera: Psychodidae)
- Telmatoscopus albipuntatus (Diptera: Psychodidae)
- Telmatoscopus kulas (Diptera: Psychodidae)
- Telmatoscopus mcclurei (Diptera: Psychodidae)
- Trichomyia batu (Diptera: Psychodidae)
- Trichomyia malaya (Diptera: Psychodidae)
- Unidentified (Diptera: Sarcophagidae)
- Bradysia flagellicornis (Diptera: Sciaridae)
- Bradysia leucocerca (Diptera: Sciaridae)
- Bradysia platytergum (Diptera: Sciaridae)
- Bradysia spp. (Diptera: Sciaridae)
- Bradysia leucocerca (Diptera: Sciaridae)
- Phorodonta malayana (Diptera: Sciaridae)
- Plastosciara near brevicalcarata (Diptera: Sciaridae)
- Soudekia sp. (Diptera: Sciaridae)
- Leptocera brevicostata (Diptera: Sphaeroceridae)
- Sargus metallinus (Diptera: Stratiomyidae)
- Helius cavernicolus (Diptera: Tipulidae)
- Cleon sp. (Ephemeroptera: Ephemeridae)
- Myiophanes fluitaria (Hemiptera: Reduviidae)
- Unidentified (Hemiptera: Cydnidae)
- Bagauda lucifigus (Hemiptera: Reduviidae)
- Reduvius gua (Hemiptera: Reduviidae)
- Fulvinus brevicornis (Hemiptera: Miridae)
- Apanteles carpatus (Hymenoptera: Braconidae)
- Apanteles sp. (Hymenoptera: Braconidae)
- Aulosaphes sp. (Hymenoptera: Braconidae)
- Epitranus lacteipennis (Hymenoptera: Chalcididae)
- Epitranus stantoni (Hymenoptera: Chalcididae)
- Bathroponera rufipes (Hymenoptera: Formicidae)
- Bathroponera tridentata (Hymenoptera: Formicidae)
- Camponotus sp. (Hymenoptera: Formicidae)
- Leptogenys diminuta (Hymenoptera: Formicidae)
- Monomorium pharaonis (Hymenoptera: Formicidae)
- Paratrechina longicornis (Hymenoptera: Formicidae)
- Pheidole javana (Hymenoptera: Formicidae)
- Ponera sp. (Hymenoptera: Formicidae)
- Pristomyrmex sp. (Hymenoptera: Formicidae)
- Tapinoma melanocephalum (Hymenoptera: Formicidae)
- Hypsicerca cavicola (Hymenoptera: Ichneumonidae)
- Hypsicerca fullawayi (Hymenoptera: Ichneumonidae)
- Trogaspidia sp. (Hymenoptera: Mutillidae)
- Opogona cerodelta (Lepidoptera: Lyonetidae)
- Attacus atlas (Lepidoptera: Saturniidae)
- Tinea antricola (Lepidoptera: Tineidae)
- Tinea palaechrysis (Lepidoptera: Tineidae)
- Neglurus vitripennis (Neuroptera: Myrmeleontidae)
- Diestrammena gravely (Orthoptera: Gryllacridae)
- Gryllotalpa fulvipes (Orthoptera: Gryllotalpidae)
- Mermecophilus dubius (Orthoptera: Gryllidae)
- Pycnoscelus striatus (Blattodea: Blaberidae)
- Liposcelis sp. (Psocoptera: Liposcelidae)
- Parasoa haploneura (Psocoptera: Lepidopsocidae)
- Psyllipsocus batuensis (Psocoptera: Psyllipsocidae)
- Ectopsocus maindroni (Psocoptera: Peripsocidae)
- Parasoa haploneura (Psocoptera: Forficulidae)
- Thaumapsylla breviceps orientalis (Siphonaptera: Ischnopsyllidae)
- Parabathynella malaya (Bathynellacea: Bathynellidae)
- Armadillo intermixtus (Isopoda: Armadillidiidae)
- Philoscia dobakholi (Isopoda: Oniscidae)
- Unidentified (Podocopida: Cyprididae)
- Chaerilus prob. celebensis (Scorpionida: Chactidae)
- Bufo asper (Anura: Bufonidae)
- Bufo melanostictus (Anura: Bufonidae)
- Callula pulchra (Anura: Microhylidae)
- Rana calconota (Squamata: Scincidae)
- Collocalia sp. (Apodiformes: Apodidae)
- Hirundo daurica (Passeriformes: Hirundinidae)
- Myophoneus flavirostris (Passeriformes: Turdidae)
- Taphozous melanopogon (Chiroptera: Emballonuridae)
- Eonycteris spelaea (Chiroptera: Pteropodidae)
- Hipposideros armiger debilis (Chiroptera: Rhinolophidae)
- Hipposideros bicolor (Chiroptera: Rhinolophidae)
- Hipposideros diadema vicarius (Chiroptera: Rhinolophidae)
- Hipposideros galiterus (Chiroptera: Rhinolophidae)
- Rhinolophus affinis superans (Chiroptera: Rhinolophidae)
- Rhinolophus luctus morio (Chiroptera: Rhinolophidae)
- Myotis mystacinus (Chiroptera: Vespertilionidae)
- Rattus rattus jalorensis (Rodentia: Muridae)
- Crocidura malayana (Soricomorpha: Soricidae)
- Elaphe taeniura (Squamata: Colubridae)
- Dryophiops rubescens (Squamata: Colubridae)
- Ahaetulla formosa (Squamata: Colubridae)
- Gecko marmorata (Squamata: Gekkonidae)
- Lygosoma scotophilum (Squamata: Scincidae)
- Paludomus buccula, Paludomus buccula var. minuta (Thiaridae)
- Opeas doveri (Stylommatophora: Stenogyridae)
- Opeas dimorpha (Stylommatophora: Stenogyridae)
- Achatina fulica (Pulmonata: Achatinidae)
- Dugesia sp. (Seriata: Scincidae)
