= List of Psychoda species =

These 392 species belong to Psychoda, a genus of moth flies in the family Psychodidae.

== Psychoda species ==
- Psychoda aberrans Tonnoir, 1922
- Psychoda ablucens Quate & Quate, 1967
- Psychoda absidata Quate & Quate, 1967
- Psychoda acanthostyla Tokunaga, 1957
- Psychoda aculeata Quate, 1996
- Psychoda acuta Tonnoir, 1939
- Psychoda acutilamina Quate, 1959
- Psychoda acutipennis Tonnoir, 1920
- Psychoda aderces Quate, 1962
- Psychoda adumbrata Satchell, 1953
- Psychoda adunca Wagner & Andersen, 2007
- Psychoda adyscheres Quate, 1959
- Psychoda aitkeni Quate, 1959
- Psychoda alabangensis Del Rosario, 1936
- Psychoda albescens Quate & Quate, 1967
- Psychoda albida Tonnoir, 1939
- Psychoda albidonigra Tonnoir, 1939
- Psychoda albipennis Zetterstedt, 1850
- Psychoda albopicta Brunetti, 1911
- Psychoda alia Quate, 1962
- Psychoda allodapa Quate, 1959
- Psychoda alternata Williston, 1824
- Psychoda alternicula Quate, 1955
- Psychoda alticola Vaillant, 1973
- Psychoda alveata Quate & Quate, 1967
- Psychoda amazonensis Cordeiro, 2008
- Psychoda amphorica Tonnoir, 1939
- Psychoda angustisternata Satchell, 1955
- Psychoda annectans Quate & Quate, 1967
- Psychoda apennata Satchell, 1953
- Psychoda aponesos Quate, 1959
- Psychoda apparitia Quate, 1996
- Psychoda arcuata Satchell, 1953
- Psychoda armillariphila Vaillant, 1988
- Psychoda articaula Quate, 1996
- Psychoda articuliga Quate, 1965
- Psychoda atlantica Cordeiro, Bravo & Carvalho, 2011
- Psychoda bahiensis Cordeiro, Bravo & Carvalho, 2011
- Psychoda balaenica Quate, 1996
- Psychoda barbigera Quate & Quate, 1967
- Psychoda bicordata Quate, 1996
- Psychoda bidigitalis Quate, 1965
- Psychoda bifurcata Tokunaga, 1958
- Psychoda bilobata Tonnoir, 1939
- Psychoda biretinaculata Wagner, 1978
- Psychoda bisacula Quate, 1996
- Psychoda bitrunculens Quate & Quate, 1967
- Psychoda blandita Quate & Quate, 1967
- Psychoda bogotensis Wagner & Joost, 1994
- Psychoda bojata Quate & Quate, 1967
- Psychoda brachyptera Quate, 1964
- Psychoda brassi Quate & Quate, 1967
- Psychoda brevicerca Huang & Chen, 1992
- Psychoda brevicornis Tonnoir, 1940
- Psychoda bulbosa (Ježek & Harten, 2006)
- Psychoda buxoides Quate, 1996
- Psychoda buxtoni Withers, 1988
- Psychoda byblis Quate, 1962
- Psychoda calceata Meigen, 1818
- Psychoda calva Satchell, 1955
- Psychoda campbellica Quate, 1964
- Psychoda canalis Quate, 1999
- Psychoda canlaones Quate, 1965
- Psychoda capitipenis Ibáñez-Bernal, 1991
- Psychoda caudata Quate, 1962
- Psychoda celebris Quate, 1962
- Psychoda cetreta Quate & Quate, 1967
- Psychoda cicii Ipe, Ipe & Kishore, 1986
- Psychoda cinerea Banks, 1894
- Psychoda cochlearia Satchell, 1950
- Psychoda collina Quate, 1965
- Psychoda complexa Cordeiro, Bravo & Carvalho, 2011
- Psychoda concavula Cordeiro, Bravo & Carvalho, 2011
- Psychoda concinna Quate & Quate, 1967
- Psychoda congruens Satchell, 1955
- Psychoda consobrina Satchell, 1955
- Psychoda contigua Quate, 1966
- Psychoda contortula Satchell, 1955
- Psychoda cordiforma Quate, 1996
- Psychoda crassipenis Tonnoir, 1940
- Psychoda crenula Quate, 1962
- Psychoda cristata Duckhouse, 1966
- Psychoda cristula Quate, 1965
- Psychoda cultella Salmela, Kvifte & More, 2012
- Psychoda cylindrica Wagner, 1989
- Psychoda dantilandensis Bravo, Cordeiro & Chagas, 2006
- Psychoda debilis Quate & Quate, 1967
- Psychoda degenera Walker, 1848
- Psychoda delicata Quate, 1965
- Psychoda dennesi Satchell, 1953
- Psychoda dentata Tonnoir, 1939
- Psychoda despicata Wagner, 1978
- Psychoda deviata Tonnoir, 1939
- Psychoda dewulfi Satchell, 1955
- Psychoda disacca Duckhouse, 1966
- Psychoda dissidens Quate & Quate, 1967
- Psychoda divaricata Duckhouse, 1968
- Psychoda dolomitica Salamanna & Sarà, 1980
- Psychoda domestica Haseman, 1908
- Psychoda duaspica Quate & Quate, 1967
- Psychoda duplilamnata Tokunaga, 1957
- Psychoda echinata Quate & Quate, 1967
- Psychoda efflatouni Tonnoir, 1922
- Psychoda elegans Kincaid, 1897
- Psychoda entolopha Quate, 1996
- Psychoda eremita Quate, 1964
- Psychoda erminea Eaton, 1893
- Psychoda erratilis Quate & Quate, 1967
- Psychoda esakii Tokunaga, 1958
- Psychoda esfahanica (Ježek, 1990)
- Psychoda euboana Vaillant, 1988
- Psychoda exigua Quate & Quate, 1967
- Psychoda exilis Quate & Quate, 1967
- Psychoda fasciata Quate, 1965
- Psychoda felina Quate, 1965
- Psychoda filipenis Satchell, 1955
- Psychoda fimbriatissima Blanchard, 1852
- Psychoda flagellata Quate, 1996
- Psychoda flava Edwards, 1927
- Psychoda flexichela Quate, 1965
- Psychoda flexistyla Satchell, 1955
- Psychoda floropsis Quate & Quate, 1967
- Psychoda floscula Quate, 1962
- Psychoda formosa Satchell, 1954
- Psychoda formosana Tokunaga, 1957
- Psychoda formosensis Tokunaga, 1957
- Psychoda formosiensis Tokunaga, 1957
- Psychoda frivola Quate, 1965
- Psychoda fucastra Quate, 1962
- Psychoda fucosa Quate, 1962
- Psychoda fulvohirta Brunetti, 1911
- Psychoda fumetaria Vaillant, 1988
- Psychoda fungicola Tokunaga, 1953
- Psychoda furcillata Quate & Quate, 1967
- Psychoda fusticola Quate, 1965
- Psychoda gehrkeae Quate, 1959
- Psychoda gemella Quate & Quate, 1967
- Psychoda gemina (Eaton, 1904)
- Psychoda geniculata Brunetti, 1911
- Psychoda gilvipes Brunetti, 1908
- Psychoda glamocensis Wagner, 2020
- Psychoda gracicaulis Quate & Quate, 1967
- Psychoda gracilipenis Duckhouse, 1966
- Psychoda gressitti Quate, 1959
- Psychoda grisescens Tonnoir, 1922
- Psychoda guamensis Quate, 1959
- Psychoda hamatospicula Satchell, 1955
- Psychoda harrisi Satchell, 1950
- Psychoda hastata Quate & Quate, 1967
- Psychoda helotes Quate, 1962
- Psychoda hemicorcula Quate, 1959
- Psychoda hespera Quate, 1959
- Psychoda hirsutaria Audinet-Serville, 1828
- Psychoda inaequalis Satchell, 1950
- Psychoda incompta Quate, 1996
- Psychoda indica Vaillant, 1965
- Psychoda innotabilis Quate, 1962
- Psychoda inornata Grimshaw, 1901
- Psychoda itoco Tokunaga & Komyo, 1955
- Psychoda ituberanensis Cordeiro, Bravo & Carvalho, 2011
- Psychoda iucunda Wagner, Andrade & Gonsalves, 2022
- Psychoda jezeki Withers, 1988
- Psychoda johnsoni Ipe, Ipe & Kishore, 1986
- Psychoda jucunda Quate, 1962
- Psychoda juliae Wagner & Masteller, 1996
- Psychoda kalabanica Quate, 1962
- Psychoda kea Quate, 1962
- Psychoda khoralkhwairensis (Ježek & Harten, 2006)
- Psychoda kishorei Ipe, Ipe & Kishore, 1986
- Psychoda lamina Quate & Quate, 1967
- Psychoda laticaula Quate, 1996
- Psychoda laticeps Quate, 1996
- Psychoda latipennis Tonnoir, 1939
- Psychoda latisternata Tonnoir, 1939
- Psychoda lativentris Berdén, 1952
- Psychoda lebanica Vaillant & Moubayed
- Psychoda limicola Vaillant, 1973
- Psychoda litotes Quate, 1996
- Psychoda lloydi Satchell, 1950
- Psychoda lobata Tonnoir, 1940
- Psychoda longifringa Haseman, 1907
- Psychoda longiseta Tokunaga & Komyo, 1955
- Psychoda longivirga Huang & Chen, 1992
- Psychoda lucubrans Quate, 1959
- Psychoda lusca Quate, 1965
- Psychoda lusitanica Vaillant & Terra, 1987
- Psychoda lutea Quate, 1962
- Psychoda luzonica Quate, 1965
- Psychoda macispina Quate & Quate, 1967
- Psychoda maculipennis Brunetti, 1911
- Psychoda magna Vaillant, 1965
- Psychoda magnipalpus Quate, 1960
- Psychoda makati Del Rosario, 1936
- Psychoda malayica Quate, 1962
- Psychoda malickyi Vaillant, 1988
- Psychoda malleola Tokunaga & Komyo, 1955
- Psychoda malleopenis Satchell, 1953
- Psychoda manaliensis Ipe, Ipe & Kishore, 1986
- Psychoda martini Hogue, 1970
- Psychoda masatierrensis Satchell, 1952
- Psychoda matogrossensis Cordeiro, Bravo & Carvalho, 2011
- Psychoda maxima Tonnoir, 1939
- Psychoda mediocris Quate, 1959
- Psychoda megale Quate, 1957
- Psychoda meyi Wagner, 2003
- Psychoda mimica Quate, 1996
- Psychoda minuta Banks, 1894
- Psychoda mirabilis Quate & Quate, 1967
- Psychoda miyatakei Tokunaga, 1958
- Psychoda modesta Tonnoir, 1939
- Psychoda moleva Quate, 1965
- Psychoda montana Wagner, 2000
- Psychoda monticola Quate & Quate, 1967
- Psychoda moravica Vaillant, 1966
- Psychoda morogorica Wagner & Andersen, 2007
- Psychoda motoharui Tokunaga & Komyo, 1955
- Psychoda mundula Duckhouse, 1966
- Psychoda musae Del Rosario, 1936
- Psychoda muscicola Vaillant, 1963
- Psychoda mycophila Vaillant, 1988
- Psychoda neoformosana Duckhouse, 1966
- Psychoda nigripennis Brunetti, 1908
- Psychoda nigriventris Tokunaga, 1958
- Psychoda nikhilii Ipe, Ipe & Kishore, 1986
- Psychoda nilgiriensis Ipe, Ipe & Kishore, 1986
- Psychoda nolana Quate & Quate, 1967
- Psychoda notatipennis Brunetti, 1913
- Psychoda novaezealandica Satchell, 1950
- Psychoda nugatrix Báez & Vaillant, 1991
- Psychoda nya Quate, 1962
- Psychoda obeliske Quate, 1996
- Psychoda obscuripennis (Ježek & Harten, 2006)
- Psychoda occulta Quate & Quate, 1967
- Psychoda ocellata Quate, 1962
- Psychoda ochra Quate, 1959
- Psychoda oculifera Quate & Quate, 1967
- Psychoda orbicularis Brunetti, 1911
- Psychoda orientalis Wagner, 1978
- Psychoda pacilens Quate & Quate, 1967
- Psychoda pala Quate & Quate, 1967
- Psychoda panajiensis Ipe, Ipe & Kishore, 1986
- Psychoda paraderces Quate, 1962
- Psychoda paraguadens Quate & Quate, 1967
- Psychoda paraloba Quate & Quate, 1967
- Psychoda paranaensis Cordeiro, Bravo & Carvalho, 2011
- Psychoda parsivena Quate, 1959
- Psychoda parthenogenetica Tonnoir, 1940
- Psychoda pedunculata Cordeiro, Bravo & Carvalho, 2011
- Psychoda pellucida Quate, 1962
- Psychoda penicillata Satchell, 1950
- Psychoda pentagona Cordeiro, Bravo & Carvalho, 2011
- Psychoda perlonga Satchell, 1955
- Psychoda phalaenoides (Linnaeus, 1758)
- Psychoda phalanga Quate, 1965
- Psychoda phratra Quate, 1996
- Psychoda pinguicula Quate & Quate, 1967
- Psychoda pitilla Quate, 1996
- Psychoda plaesia Quate, 1959
- Psychoda platalea Quate, 1965
- Psychoda platilobata Tokunaga, 1957
- Psychoda plumbea Ibáñez-Bernal, 1991
- Psychoda plumosa Tonnoir, 1939
- Psychoda plutea Quate & Quate, 1967
- Psychoda pontina Sarà, 1953
- Psychoda prolarta Quate, 1965
- Psychoda pseudalternata Williams, 1946
- Psychoda pseudalternicula Salamanna, 1975
- Psychoda pseudoalbipennis Santos Abreu, 1930
- Psychoda pseudobrevicornis Tokunaga, 1957
- Psychoda pseudocanescens Santos Abreu, 1930
- Psychoda pseudocompar Tonnoir, 1929
- Psychoda pseudomaxima Tonnoir, 1939
- Psychoda pseudominuta Wagner, 1978
- Psychoda psilotes Quate, 1996
- Psychoda puertoricana Wagner & Masteller, 1996
- Psychoda pulchrima Satchell, 1954
- Psychoda pusilla Tonnoir, 1922
- Psychoda quadrata Quate & Quate, 1967
- Psychoda quadricornis Quate & Quate, 1967
- Psychoda quadrifilis Edwards, 1928
- Psychoda quadrilosa Quate & Quate, 1967
- Psychoda quadropsis Quate & Quate, 1967
- Psychoda quasisetigera Ibáñez-Bernal, 2008
- Psychoda quatei Sarà & Salamanna, 1967
- Psychoda quiniversa Quate, 1996
- Psychoda reducta Tonnoir, 1939
- Psychoda reevesi Quate, 2000
- Psychoda remata Quate & Quate, 1967
- Psychoda rhinocera Quate & Quate, 1967
- Psychoda rhipsalis Quate & Quate, 1967
- Psychoda rhis Quate, 1996
- Psychoda rosetta Quate & Quate, 1967
- Psychoda rujumensis (Ježek & Harten, 2006)
- Psychoda saites Quate, 1965
- Psychoda salicornia Quate, 1954
- Psychoda sanctijohani Ipe, Ipe & Kishore, 1986
- Psychoda sanfilippoi Salamanna, 1980
- Psychoda sarcophila Vaillant, 1988
- Psychoda satchelli Quate, 1955
- Psychoda savaiiensis Edwards, 1928
- Psychoda scotina Quate, 1959
- Psychoda scuticopenis Satchell, 1955
- Psychoda sectiga Quate & Quate, 1967
- Psychoda selangoriana Satchell, 1958
- Psychoda semberiaca Krek, 1980
- Psychoda semberica Krek, 1979
- Psychoda seorsa Quate, 1966
- Psychoda serpentina Quate, 1965
- Psychoda serrana Cordeiro, Bravo & Carvalho, 2011
- Psychoda serraorobonensis Bravo, Cordeiro & Chagas, 2006
- Psychoda serrata Wagner, 1989
- Psychoda setigera Tonnoir, 1922
- Psychoda setistyla Satchell, 1950
- Psychoda severini Tonnoir, 1922
- Psychoda sibilica Quate & Quate, 1967
- Psychoda sigma Kincaid, 1899
- Psychoda silvensis Cordeiro, Bravo & Carvalho, 2011
- Psychoda simillima Tonnoir, 1929
- Psychoda simplex Satchell, 1954
- Psychoda sinuosa Wagner, 1978
- Psychoda solangensis Kaul, 1971
- Psychoda solitaria Eaton, 1913
- Psychoda solivaga Duckhouse, 1971
- Psychoda spectabilis Quate & Quate, 1967
- Psychoda speculata Cordeiro, Bravo & Carvalho, 2011
- Psychoda sphelata Quate & Quate, 1967
- Psychoda spicula Quate & Quate, 1967
- Psychoda spinacia Quate & Quate, 1967
- Psychoda spinipelata Quate & Quate, 1967
- Psychoda spondea Quate, 1996
- Psychoda squamata Satchell, 1953
- Psychoda squamipleuris Satchell, 1953
- Psychoda squamulata Satchell, 1950
- Psychoda stenostypis Quate, 1996
- Psychoda subinflata Satchell, 1955
- Psychoda subpennata Satchell, 1953
- Psychoda subquadrilobata Tokunaga, 1957
- Psychoda surcoufi Tonnoir, 1922
- Psychoda symmetrica Vaillant, 1973
- Psychoda talamanca Quate, 1996
- Psychoda terlinoculata Quate, 1965
- Psychoda terskolina Vaillant & Joost, 1983
- Psychoda thrinax Quate, 1955
- Psychoda tiencensis Wagner, 2003
- Psychoda torquata Quate, 1962
- Psychoda tothastica Quate, 1955
- Psychoda transversa Brunetti, 1911
- Psychoda triaciculata Satchell, 1950
- Psychoda tridens Satchell, 1954
- Psychoda tridentata Sarà & Salamanna, 1967
- Psychoda trifida Wagner, 1979
- Psychoda trilobata Tokunaga, 1958
- Psychoda trilobatula Cordeiro, Bravo & Carvalho, 2011
- Psychoda trinodulosa Tonnoir, 1922
- Psychoda truncata Satchell, 1953
- Psychoda trunculens Quate, 1965
- Psychoda tumorosa Quate & Quate, 1967
- Psychoda turgida Quate, 1965
- Psychoda umbracola Quate, 1955
- Psychoda umbratica Quate, 1965
- Psychoda uncinula Quate, 1954
- Psychoda undulata Tonnoir, 1939
- Psychoda unicinula Quate
- Psychoda uniformata Haseman, 1907
- Psychoda unioculata Quate, 1965
- Psychoda vagabunda Quate, 1962
- Psychoda vaillanti Sarà & Salamanna, 1967
- Psychoda vanga Quate, 1962
- Psychoda varablanca Quate, 1996
- Psychoda velita Ibáñez-Bernal, 1993
- Psychoda verrucosa (Ježek & Harten, 2006)
- Psychoda vesca Quate & Quate, 1967
- Psychoda villosa Salamanna & Raggio, 1985
- Psychoda virgo Vaillant, 1988
- Psychoda vittata Brunetti, 1908
- Psychoda wattsi Duckhouse, 1966
- Psychoda williamsi Quate, 1954
- Psychoda wilsoni Quate & Quate, 1967
- Psychoda wirthi Quate, 1954
- Psychoda yama Quate, 1966
- Psychoda yapensis Quate, 1959
- Psychoda ypsylon Satchell, 1953
- Psychoda zetoscota Quate, 1959
- Psychoda zetterstedti (Ježek, 1983)
- Psychoda zigzagensis Del Rosario, 1936
- Psychoda zonata Satchell, 1950
- † Psychoda bulbifera Meunier, 1899
- † Psychoda eocenica Meunier, 1905
- † Psychoda oxyptera Loew, 1850
- † Psychoda rusti Stebner & Solórzano-Kraemer, 2014
- † Psychoda tzotzili Stebner & Solórzano-Kraemer, 2014
- † Psychoda usitata Quate, 1963
