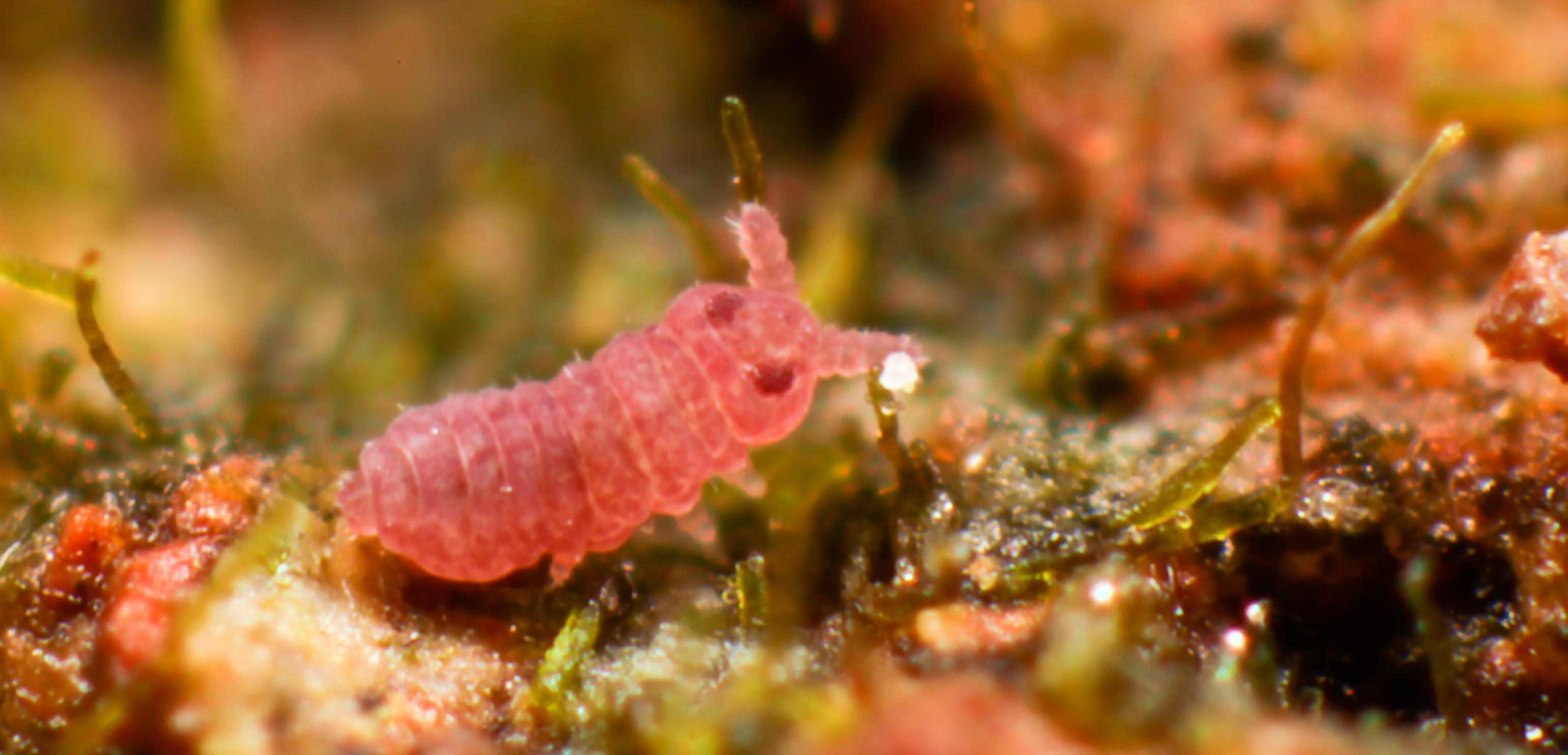

Scientific classification
- Domain: Eukaryota
- Kingdom: Animalia
- Phylum: Arthropoda
- Class: Collembola
- Order: Poduromorpha
- Family: Brachystomellidae
- Genus: Brachystomella
- Species: B. parvula

Binomial name
- Brachystomella parvula (Schaeffer, 1896)

Synonyms
- Schoettella parvula Schaeffer, 1896

= Brachystomella parvula =

Species of springtail

Brachystomella parvula is a species of springtail in the family Brachystomellidae. It is found in Europe.
