= Australella =

Australella may refer to:

- Australella, a genus of springtails in the family Brachystomellidae, synonym of Brachystomellides
- Australella, a genus of bryozoans in the family Plumatellidae, synonym of Hyalinella
