= Dhanus =

Dhanus may refer to:

- Dhanus (month), a month in the Hindu calendar
- Dhanus, a month in the Darian calendar
- Dhanus (arachnid), a genus of pseudoscorpions
- Dhanus (weapon), an Indian bow as used in Indian warfare
- Dhanus, an ancient Indian measure of length equal to four hastas

== See also ==
- Dhanush (disambiguation)
- Dhanusha (disambiguation)
- Dhanusa (disambiguation)
- Dhanu (disambiguation)
