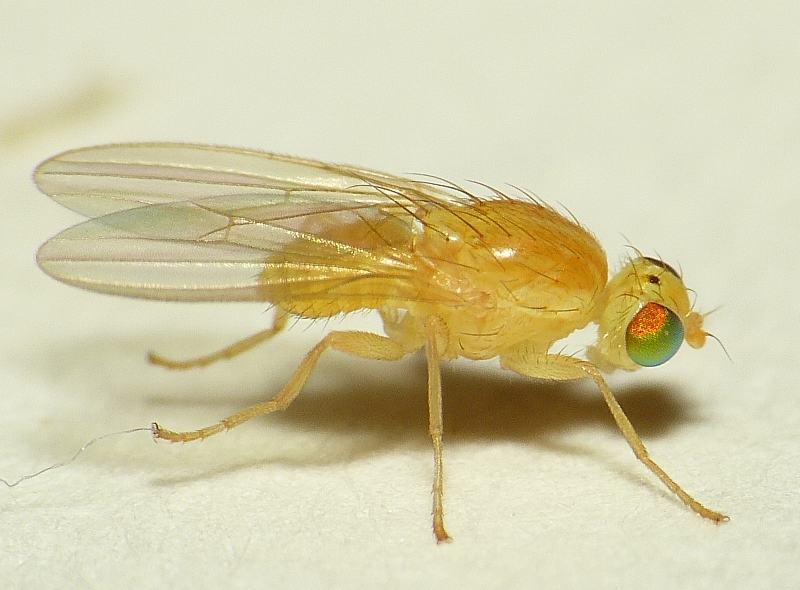

Scientific classification
- Kingdom: Animalia
- Phylum: Arthropoda
- Class: Insecta
- Order: Diptera
- Family: Chyromyidae
- Genus: Gymnochiromyia
- Species: G. flavella

Binomial name
- Gymnochiromyia flavella (Zetterstedt, 1848)

Synonyms
- Peletophila minima Becker, 1904.

= Gymnochiromyia flavella =

Species of fly

Gymnochiromyia flavella is a species of fly in the family Chyromyidae. It is found in the Palearctic.

The insect is 1.5 to 2 mm. long and yellow in colour. Its head is characterized by: a transversely oval outline of the compound eyes, a convex occiput, closely set and crossed parietal setae and three pairs of orbital setae, the front of which is directed medially and the rear one is directed posteriorly. The body is characterized by naked sternopleura, four pairs of dorsocentral setae and four rows of acrostichal setae For terms see Morphology of Diptera.

Content in this edit is translated from the existing Polish Wikipedia article at pl:Gymnochiromyia flavella; see its history for attribution
