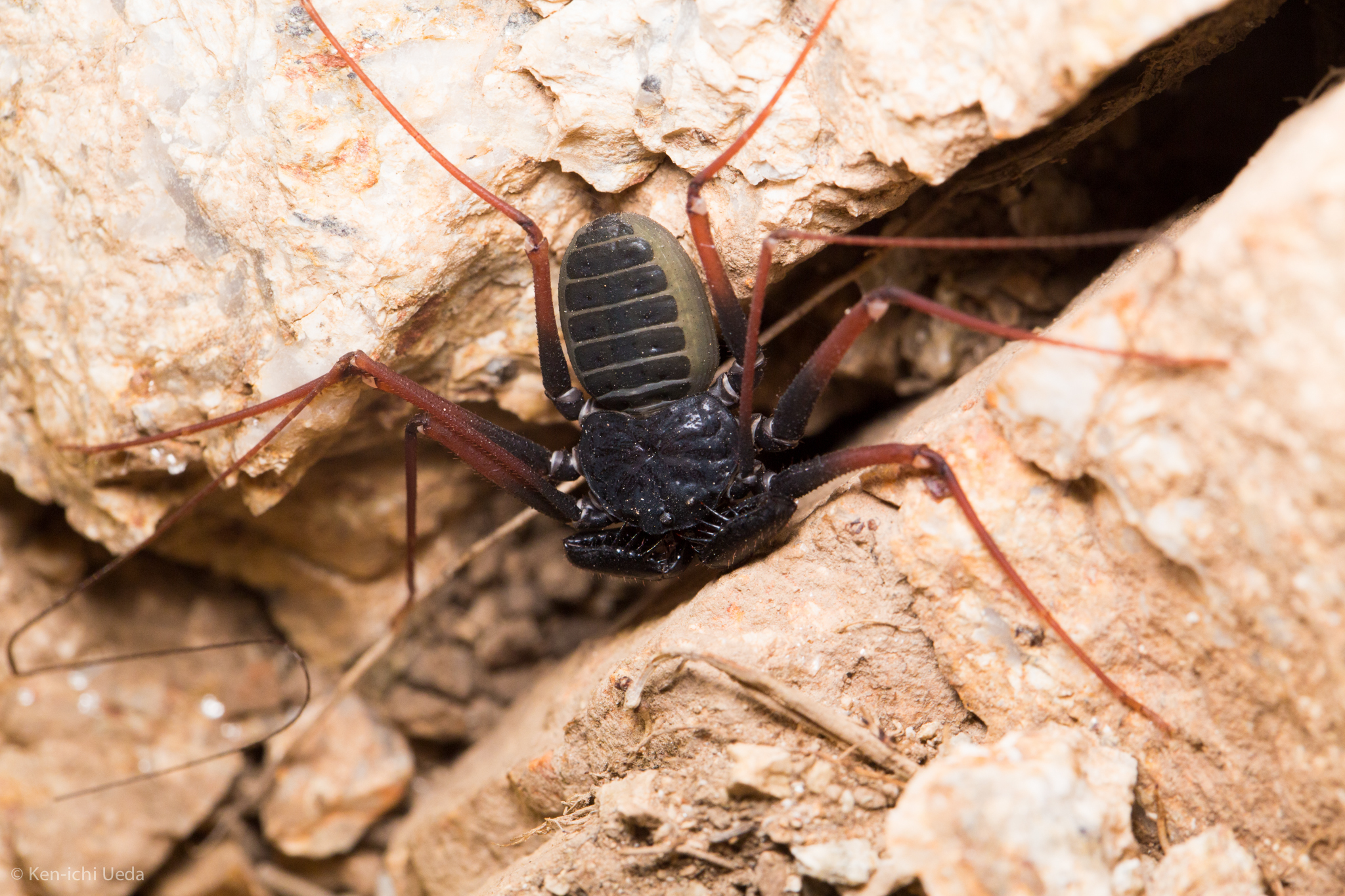
- Paraphrynus tokdod specimen in Arizona, originally identified as P. carolynae

Scientific classification
- Kingdom: Animalia
- Phylum: Arthropoda
- Subphylum: Chelicerata
- Class: Arachnida
- Order: Amblypygi
- Family: Phrynidae
- Genus: Paraphrynus
- Species: P. tokdod

Binomial name
- Paraphrynus tokdod Cazzaniga, 2024

= Paraphrynus tokdod =

Species of arachnid

Paraphrynus tokdod is a species of whipspider from the southwestern United States, described in 2024. It was split from the northernmost population of Paraphrynus carolynae.

== Description ==
Paraphrynus tokdod resembles other species within its genus, but can be distinguished by a several characteristics. Immature P. tokdod have black pedipalps, which they retain until adulthood, whereas other immature Paraphrynus have red pedipalps. The femurs of the walking legs of P. tokdod are bicolored, with the proximal portion being black and the distal portion being red. The frontal process of the carapace is enlarged compared to P. carolynae, the most similar amblypygid species. Additionally, the tubercles on the legs and carapace can be used to separate P. carolynae and P. tokdod.

== Distribution and habitat ==
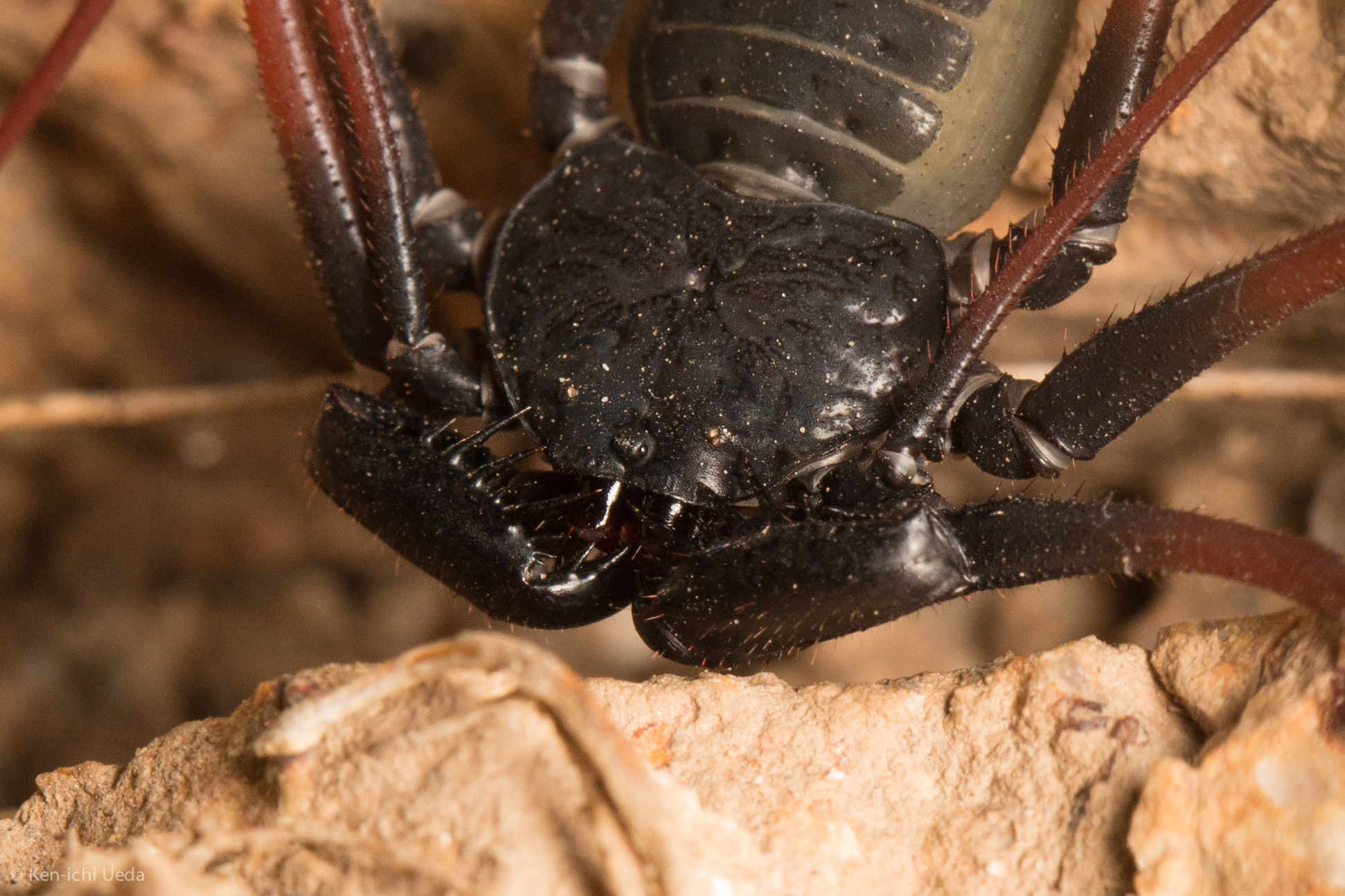
Paraphrynus tokdod, closeup of carapace, pedipalps, and femurs

Paraphrynus tokdod ranges mostly within Arizona. There are possible records from southern California and Nevada, which may not be the same species. The species may be endemic to the United States.

=== Ecology ===
The species type material was collected from rocky hillsides, usually within crevices or the abandoned burrows of other animals. Specimens were not observed in direct proximity to one another, in contrast to some more social amblypygid species. The describing authors note earth-moving behavior in captive specimens, suggesting that the species may be able to modify its hiding locations.

Paraphrynus tokdod were observed inhabiting a cave in the Tonto National Forest in Arizona, within a highly diverse underground ecosystem also containing numerous insects, scorpions, spiders, and other arthropods as well as murid rodents. P. tokdod was noted as a top invertebrate predator within this location, along with a large undescribed (as of 2025) scorpion species.
