= Dhanush (disambiguation) =

Dhanush (born 1983) is an Indian Tamil film actor, director and writer.

Dhanush may also refer to:

- Dhanus (disambiguation), several entities in ancient Indian culture
- Dhanush (missile), a missile developed by the Indian Navy
- Dhanush (howitzer), an artillery piece used by the Indian Army
- Aishwarya R. Dhanush (born 1982), Indian film director
- Inspector Dhanush, a 1991 Indian film

== See also ==
- Dhanusha (disambiguation)
- Dhanu (disambiguation)
- Dhanusa (disambiguation)
