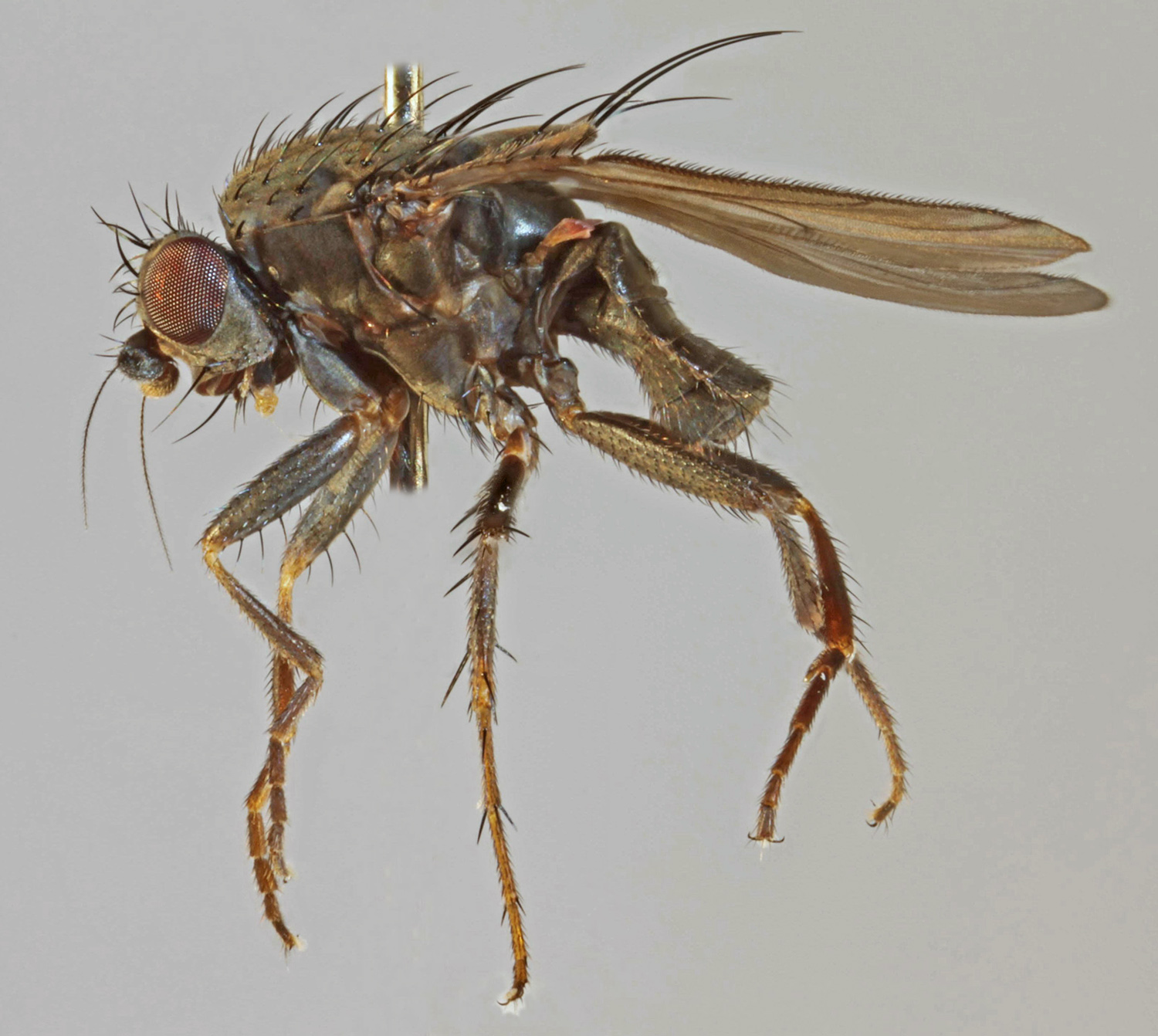

Scientific classification
- Domain: Eukaryota
- Kingdom: Animalia
- Phylum: Arthropoda
- Class: Insecta
- Order: Diptera
- Family: Sphaeroceridae
- Genus: Leptocera
- Species: L. fontinalis

Binomial name
- Leptocera fontinalis (Fallén, 1826)

= Leptocera fontinalis =

Species of fly

Leptocera fontinalis is a species of fly in the family Sphaeroceridae, the lesser dung flies. It is found in the Palearctic. The larvae live in a wide range of moist decaying organic materials where they feed on micro-organisms.
