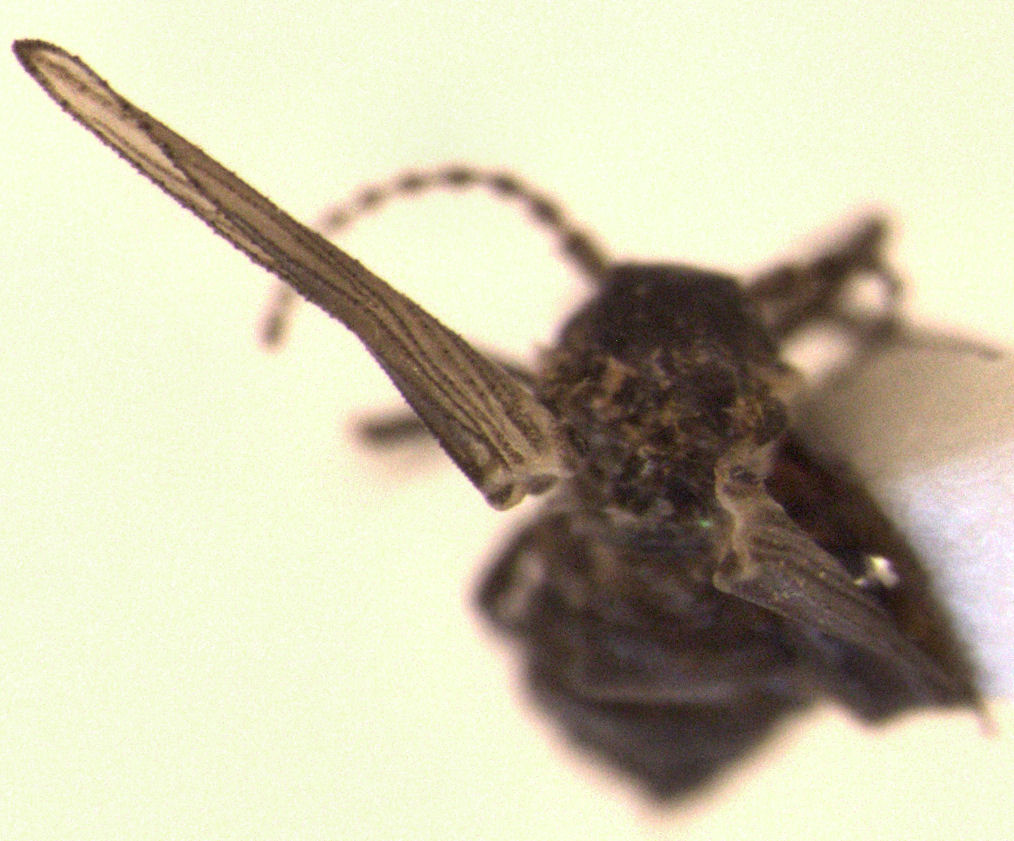

Scientific classification
- Kingdom: Animalia
- Phylum: Arthropoda
- Class: Insecta
- Order: Diptera
- Family: Psychodidae
- Genus: Psychoda
- Species: P. acutipennis

Binomial name
- Psychoda acutipennis Tonnoir, 1920

= Psychoda acutipennis =

Species of fly

Psychoda acutipennis is a species of insect of the order Diptera belonging to the family Psychodidae found in the Antipodes Islands of New Zealand.
