= Bdelloidea (mite) =

- A mite of the family Bdellidae sucks on a dead midge

Scientific classification
- Domain: Eukaryota
- Kingdom: Animalia
- Phylum: Arthropoda
- Subphylum: Chelicerata
- Class: Arachnida
- Order: Trombidiformes
- Suborder: Prostigmata
- Infraorder: Eupodina
- Superfamily: Bdelloidea

Families
- Bdellidae; Cunaxidae

Superfamily of mites

Bdelloidea is a superfamily of mites, containing the two families Bdellidae and Cunaxidae. It should not be confused with the rotifer superfamily of the same name.
