= Paraphrynus emaciatus =

Scientific classification
- Kingdom: Animalia
- Phylum: Arthropoda
- Subphylum: Chelicerata
- Class: Arachnida
- Order: Amblypygi
- Family: Phrynidae
- Genus: Paraphrynus
- Species: P. emaciatus

Binomial name
- Paraphrynus emaciatus Mullinex, 1975

Species of arachnid

Paraphrynus emaciatus is a species of whipspider (order Amblypygi), from Guatemala. The species is named for its extremely thin appearance compared to many other whipspiders.

== Description ==
Paraphrynus emaciatus is a large, slender whipspider, with the body of the male holotype specimen measuring 30 mm (1.2 in) long. The pedipalps are extremely elongated compared to other Paraphrynus species known at the time of its description, with the tibia being 10 times longer than it is wide. The legs are also extremely elongated and thin, the femurs of the holotype specimen being longer than its total body length.

== Distribution and habitat ==
The holotype specimen was collected from a cave in Alta Verapaz department, Guatemala. Additional specimens have been collected from Sacatepéquez department. It is common within some caves in these departments, and has also been recorded inside human homes in Guatemala City.
