= Tarantulidae =

Scientific classification
- Domain: Eukaryota
- Kingdom: Animalia
- Phylum: Arthropoda
- Subphylum: Chelicerata
- Class: Arachnida
- Order: Amblypygi
- Family: Tarantulidae; Leach, 1814

Family of arachnids

Tarantulidae is a family of arachnids belonging to the order Amblypygi.

Genera:

- Acanthophrynus Kraepelin, 1899
- Paraphrynus Moreno, 1940
- Phrynus Lamarck, 1801
