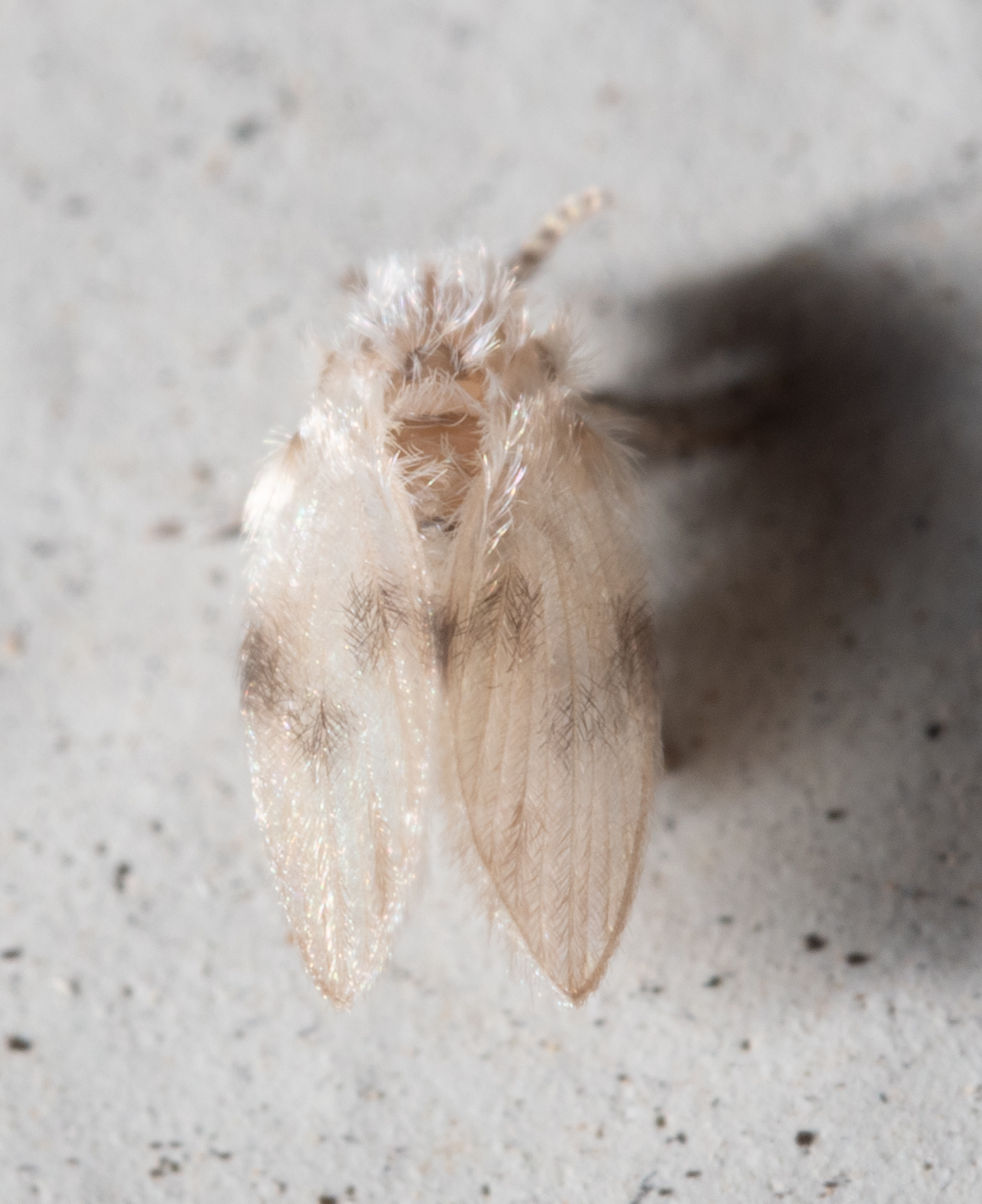
- Psychoda sigma, Australia

Scientific classification
- Domain: Eukaryota
- Kingdom: Animalia
- Phylum: Arthropoda
- Class: Insecta
- Order: Diptera
- Family: Psychodidae
- Subfamily: Psychodinae
- Tribe: Psychodini
- Genus: Psychoda
- Species: P. sigma

Binomial name
- Psychoda sigma Kincaid, 1899

Synonyms
- Logima sigma (Kincaid, 1899); Psychoda sigma surcoufi Tonnoir, 1922

= Psychoda sigma =

Species of fly

Psychoda sigma, the moth fly, is a species of moth fly in the family Psychodidae.
