= Dhanusa =

Dhanusa may refer to:

- Dhanusa District, Nepal
- Dhanusha (unit), ancient Indian unit of measurement

== See also ==
- Dhanusha (disambiguation)
- Dhanush (disambiguation)
- Dhanus (disambiguation)
