= Dhanusha =

Dhanusha may refer to:

- Bow and arrow, in Sanskrit
- Dhanusha (unit), ancient Indian unit of measurement
- Dhanusha District, Nepal

== See also ==
- Dhanush (disambiguation)
- Dhanus (disambiguation)
- Dhanusa (disambiguation)
