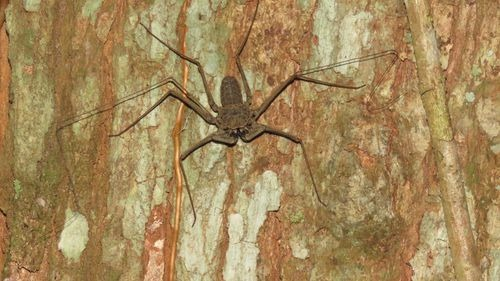

Scientific classification
- Kingdom: Animalia
- Phylum: Arthropoda
- Subphylum: Chelicerata
- Class: Arachnida
- Order: Amblypygi
- Family: Phrynidae
- Genus: Paraphrynus
- Species: P. laevifrons

Binomial name
- Paraphrynus laevifrons Pocock, 1894

= Paraphrynus laevifrons =

Species of arachnid

Paraphrynus laevifrons is a species of whipspider from Central America.

== Description ==
Like all amblypygi, Paraphrynus laevifrons walks on six legs, the front pair of legs being elongated to serve as delicate sensory appendages. The pedipalps are adapted into spiny appendages used to capture prey. The species measures between 18 and 28 mm (0.71 and 1.10 in) in total body length. It can be separated from other species in its genus by examining the spines on its pedipalps.

== Behavior ==
As with other amblypygids, P. laevifrons are able to navigate back to their home refuge after hunting during the night. A 2017 study showed that individuals are able to return to their home location after being displaced by up to 10 meters even when completely blinded. However, preventing the amblypygi from using their antenniform legs largely removed their homing ability. The authors hypothesize that olfaction plays an essential role in amblypygid homing.

== Distribution and habitat ==
Paraphrynus laevifrons is widely distributed throughout Central America and Southern North America, including Guatemala, El Salvador, Nicaragua, Costa Rica, Panama, and Colombia. Within Central America, it is found in diverse habitats such as caves and humid or dry forests, and even ant and termite colonies.

=== Microhabitat use ===
In a study of P. laevifrons from Las Cruces Biological Station in Costa Rica, individuals were found with higher abundance in creek transects than in trail transects. Overall, the presence of daytime refuges and microhabitats providing more shelter, such as overhangs, seemed to most strongly predict the abundance of the species. Notably, the study area was within forest that had been selectively logged, so human impact may have effected microhabitat use. In addition to the spatial characteristics of microhabitats, the preference of this species for higher humidity may have driven abundance in the possibly higher humidity creek microhabitats.
