= Tinea antricola =

Scientific classification
- Kingdom: Animalia
- Phylum: Arthropoda
- Class: Insecta
- Order: Lepidoptera
- Family: Tineidae
- Genus: Tinea
- Species: T. antricola

Binomial name
- Tinea antricola Meyrick, 1924

Synonyms
- Tinea palaechrysis Meyrick 1929; Tinea hypochrysa Meyrick 1927

Species of moth

Tinea antricola is a cave-dwelling moth of the family Tineidae. It is known from India, Sumatra, Indonesia and Malaysia.

The wingspan is 8–11 mm. The forewings are pale grey. The hindwings are light brassy-grey.
