= Dhanus (arachnid) =

Scientific classification
- Kingdom: Animalia
- Phylum: Arthropoda
- Subphylum: Chelicerata
- Class: Arachnida
- Order: Pseudoscorpiones
- Family: Ideoroncidae
- Genus: Dhanus; Chamberlin, 1930

Genus of pseudoscorpions

Dhanus is a genus of pseudoscorpions in the family Ideoroncidae. They are found in Asia, between Malaysia to the east and Iran and Soqotra to the west. It includes the following species:

- Dhanus afghanicus
- Dhanus doveri, synonymous with Dhanus sumatranus
- Dhanus hashimi
- Dhanus indicus
- Dhanus pohli
- Dhanus socotraensis
- Dhanus taitii
- Dhanus tioman

The species Dhanus siamensis has been recently reclassified in a new genus of its own called Sironcus.
