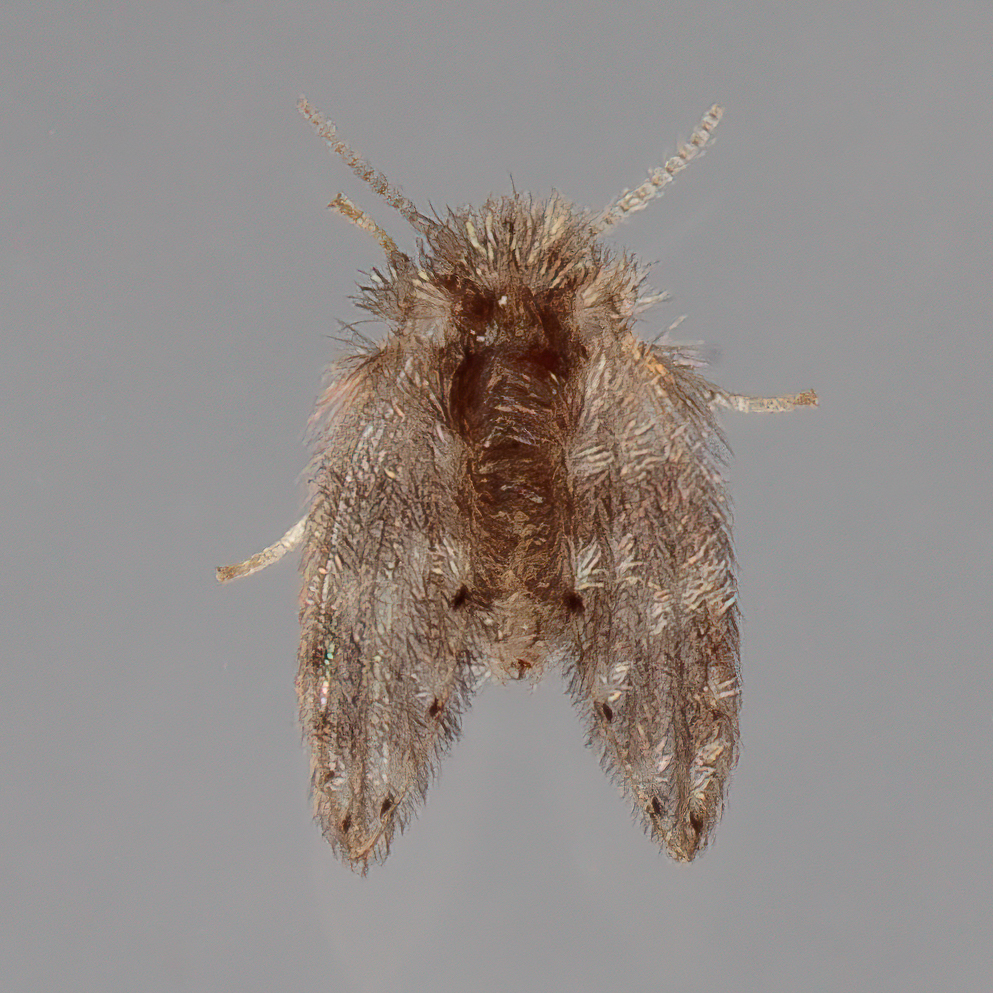

Scientific classification
- Kingdom: Animalia
- Phylum: Arthropoda
- Class: Insecta
- Order: Diptera
- Family: Psychodidae
- Genus: Psychoda
- Species: P. alternata

Binomial name
- Psychoda alternata Say, 1824

Synonyms
- Psychoda albimaculata Welch, 1912; Psychoda dakotensis Dyar, 1926; Psychoda floridica Haseman, 1907; Psychoda nocturnala Haseman, 1907; Psychoda schizura Kincaid, 1899

= Psychoda alternata =

Species of moth fly, the drain fly

Psychoda alternata is a species of moth fly in the family Psychodidae, commonly known as the trickling filter fly or drain fly. The larva is semiaquatic and lives in the gelatinous ooze associated with leaks of sewage effluent, drains, and in trickling filter systems.

== Description ==
The adult female fly is about 4 mm (0.2 in) long, the male being slightly smaller. The wings are broad and held at an angle away from the body. They are clad with dense tufts of hairlike scales along the veins, and are grey, with a mottled appearance. The wing muscles are relatively weak and the insects mostly run or hop, occasionally making short flights. The males hatch first and only survive for a few days, while unmated females may live for a week.

== Distribution and habitat ==
Originating in North America, this insect has spread around the world. Its range includes Europe, western Asia and South America. It had become established in Britain by 2000, in Brazil by 2006, in Norway by 2011, in Iraq and Croatia by 2013 and in Spain by 2016. The larvae develop in moist areas rich in organic matter such as drains and trickling filter systems, but also in ditches and sludges of decaying organic matter. The adult insects seldom move far from where they were hatched.

== Life cycle ==
The eggs are laid in the moist places in which the larvae will feed. Up to 100 are laid by the female, sometimes singly, but usually in gelatinous batches of 15 to 40. The eggs are translucent and under a millimetre in diameter. They hatch in about two days at 70 °F (21 °C). The larvae are slender, whitish, cream or pale brown, with a head with strong jaws, 11 body segments, and siphons on the hindermost two segments. The larval stage lasts for about 15 days at 70 °F, and it is in the larval stage that the insect will usually overwinter, in diapause. The pupae are yellowish brown to brown and have a pair of ear-like respiratory processes on the head end. The pupal stage lasts for one or two days. Both larvae and pupae are usually to be found in the top 2.5 cm (1 in) of the substrate, sometimes deeper than this when the material is fairly dry.

== Ecology ==
A trickling filter system is a form of biological treatment widely used to process sewage. The sewage or other wastewater flows downwards over a medium such as gravel which is supported on a permeable membrane. In the medium live over 200 species of bacteria, algae, worms, protozoa, and insects including larvae of the drain fly; together these organisms form a biofilm which processes the fluid passing through the filter system and removes pollutants.
