= Brachystomellides =

Scientific classification
- Domain: Eukaryota
- Kingdom: Animalia
- Phylum: Arthropoda
- Class: Collembola
- Order: Poduromorpha
- Family: Brachystomellidae
- Genus: Brachystomellides; Arlé, 1960

Synonyms
- Australella Stach, 1949; Massoudella Ellis & Bellinger, 1973

Genus of springtails

Brachystomellides is a genus of springtails belonging to the family Brachystomellidae.

Species:

- Brachystomellides compositus R.Arlé, 1960
- Brachystomellides micropilosus Cassagnau & Rapoport, 1962
- Brachystomellides navarinensis Weiner & Najt, 1997
- Brachystomellides neuquensis Cassagnau & Rapoport, 1962
