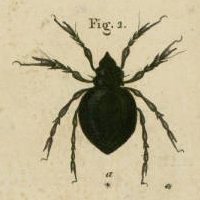
- Belba corynopus

Scientific classification
- Kingdom: Animalia
- Phylum: Arthropoda
- Subphylum: Chelicerata
- Class: Arachnida
- Order: Oribatida
- Family: Damaeidae; Berlese, 1896

= Damaeidae =

Damaeidae Temporal range: Palaeogene–present

Family of mites

Damaeidae is a family of mites. Alternative names for the family include Belbidae, and Belbodamaeidae or Hungarobelbidae. They had been previously considered to be distinct families.

Species of the family are extant in Eurasia and Northern America. Related species exist in New Zealand and South America.

== Behaviour ==
Most species of the family live in plant litter, mosses, decaying woods and organic soil layers. The family is composed of fungivores. They have an important role in regulation of the density of fungi that is harmful for plants.

== List of genera ==
The following genera are part of this family:

- Acanthobelba
- Allobelba
- Belba
- Belbodamaeus
- Damaeus
- Dameobelba
- Epidamaeus
- Hungarobelba
- Hypodamaeus
- Kunstidamaeus
- Metabelba
- Metabelbella
- Mirobelba
- Neobelba
- Nortonbelba
- Parabelbella
- Paradamaeus
- Parametabelba
- Porobelba
- Subbelba
- Spatiodamaeus
- Tectodamaeus
- Weigmannia
