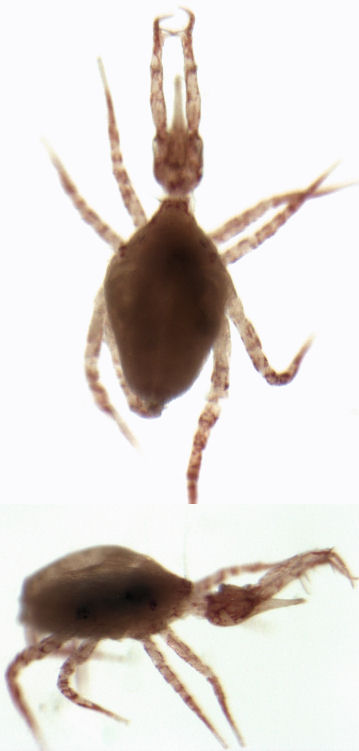
- Cunaxidae from New Zealand

Scientific classification
- Kingdom: Animalia
- Phylum: Arthropoda
- Subphylum: Chelicerata
- Class: Arachnida
- Order: Trombidiformes
- Superfamily: Bdelloidea
- Family: Cunaxidae; Thor, 1902

= Cunaxidae =

Family of mites

Cunaxidae is a family of predatory mites in the order Trombidiformes. There are at least 20 genera and 390 described species in Cunaxidae.

== Description ==
Cunaxidae have diamond-shaped bodies. Adults and nymphs have 4 pairs of 7-segmented legs, while larvae have 3 pairs of 6-segmented legs. Dorsally, they have 1 proterosomal shield (usually with 2 pairs of setae and 2 pairs of setose sensilla), 0-2 hysterosomal shields and 0-4 pairs of hysterosomal platelets. The body surface around these shields and platelets is striated. Ventrally, the leg coxae are fused to the body to form plates, and in adults the coxae of the first two leg pairs are often fused as are the coxae of the last two leg pairs. At the front of the body is the gnathosoma (mouthparts), which has a pair of pedipalps (usually ending in strong claws), a pair of chelicerae and a wedge-shaped subcapitulum.

== Distribution ==
The family has a cosmopolitan distribution, being found on all continents except Antarctica.

== Ecology ==
Cunaxidae can be found in most terrestrial habitats including on vegetation, in soil and leaf litter, vertebrate nests, animal debris, tree cavities, house dust and stored food products. Individual species are generally restricted to specific habitats.

All cunaxids are thought to be opportunistic predators, attacking various prey including bark lice, springtails, thrips, scale insects, nematodes and other mites. They may act as ambush predators (e.g. Armascirus and Dactyloscirus) or actively search for their prey (e.g. Allocunaxa). They cannot survive when only given access to plant material. An undescribed species of Rubroscirus was observed drinking honeydew in addition to eating live prey.

Cunaxids spin silk for various purposes such as protecting their eggs, constructing moulting chambers and capturing prey.

The family appears to be active year-round. For example, Neocunaxoides have been collected throughout the year in areas with hot humid summers and cold dry winters.

== Biological control potential ==
Cunaxidae are known to feed on pests of agricultural plants. However, the effects they have on prey populations have yet to be rigorously studied.

== Genera ==
- Allocunaxa
- Armascirus
- Bonzia
- Bunaxella
- Coleoscirus
- Cunaxa
- Cunaxatricha
- Cunaxoides
- Dactyloscirus
- Denheyernaxoides
- Dunaxeus
- Funaxopsis
- Lupaeus
- Neobonzia
- Neocunaxoides
- Neoscirula
- Orangescirula
- Parabonzia
- Paracunaxoides
- Pseudobonzia
- Pulaeus
- Qunaxella
- Riscus
- Rubroscirus
- Scirula
- Scutascirus
- Scutopalus
