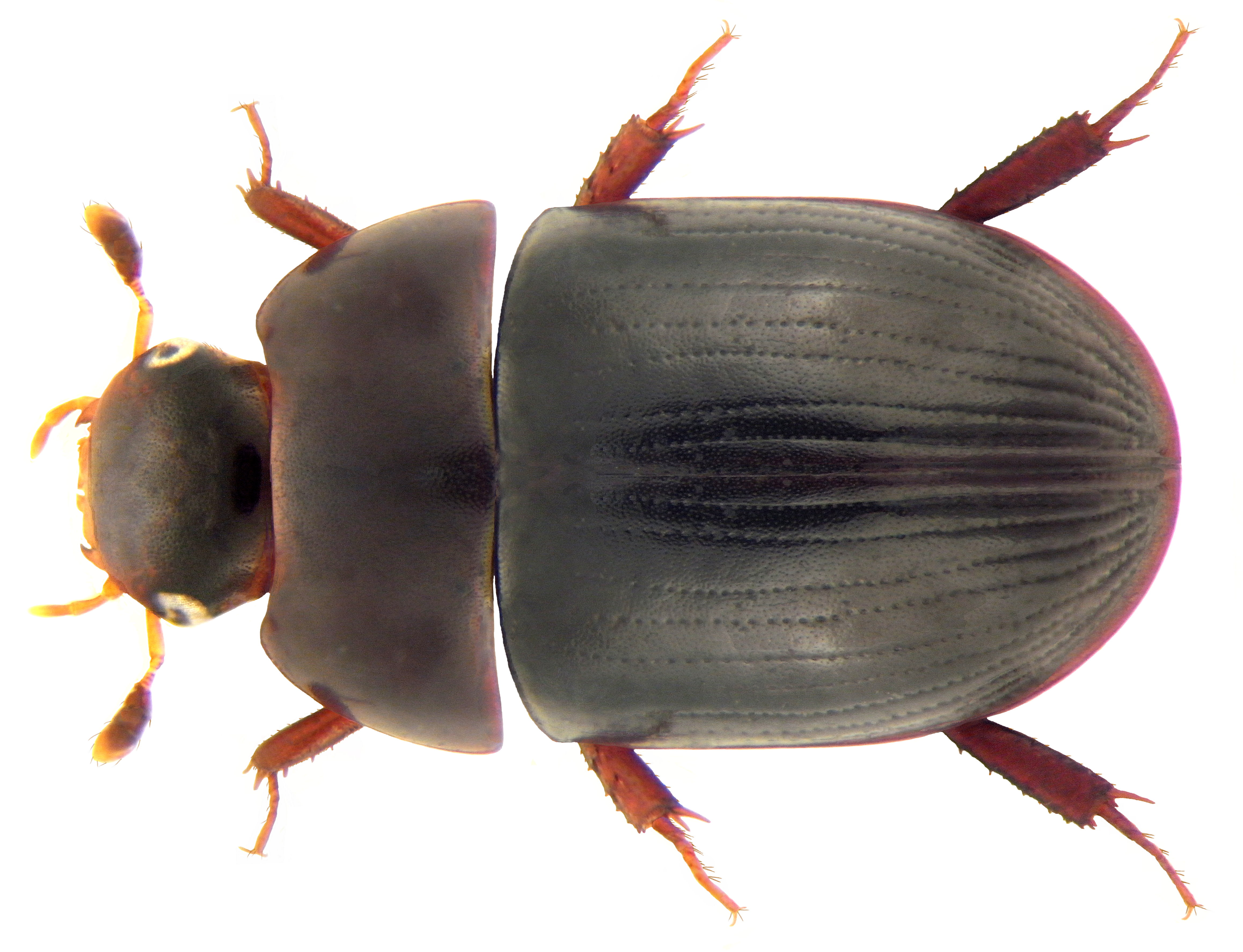
- Dactylosternum abdominale

Scientific classification
- Domain: Eukaryota
- Kingdom: Animalia
- Phylum: Arthropoda
- Class: Insecta
- Order: Coleoptera
- Suborder: Polyphaga
- Infraorder: Staphyliniformia
- Family: Hydrophilidae
- Tribe: Coelostomatini
- Genus: Dactylosternum; Wollaston, 1854

= Dactylosternum =

Genus of beetles

Dactylosternum is a genus of water scavenger beetles in the family Hydrophilidae. There are more than 20 described species in Dactylosternum.

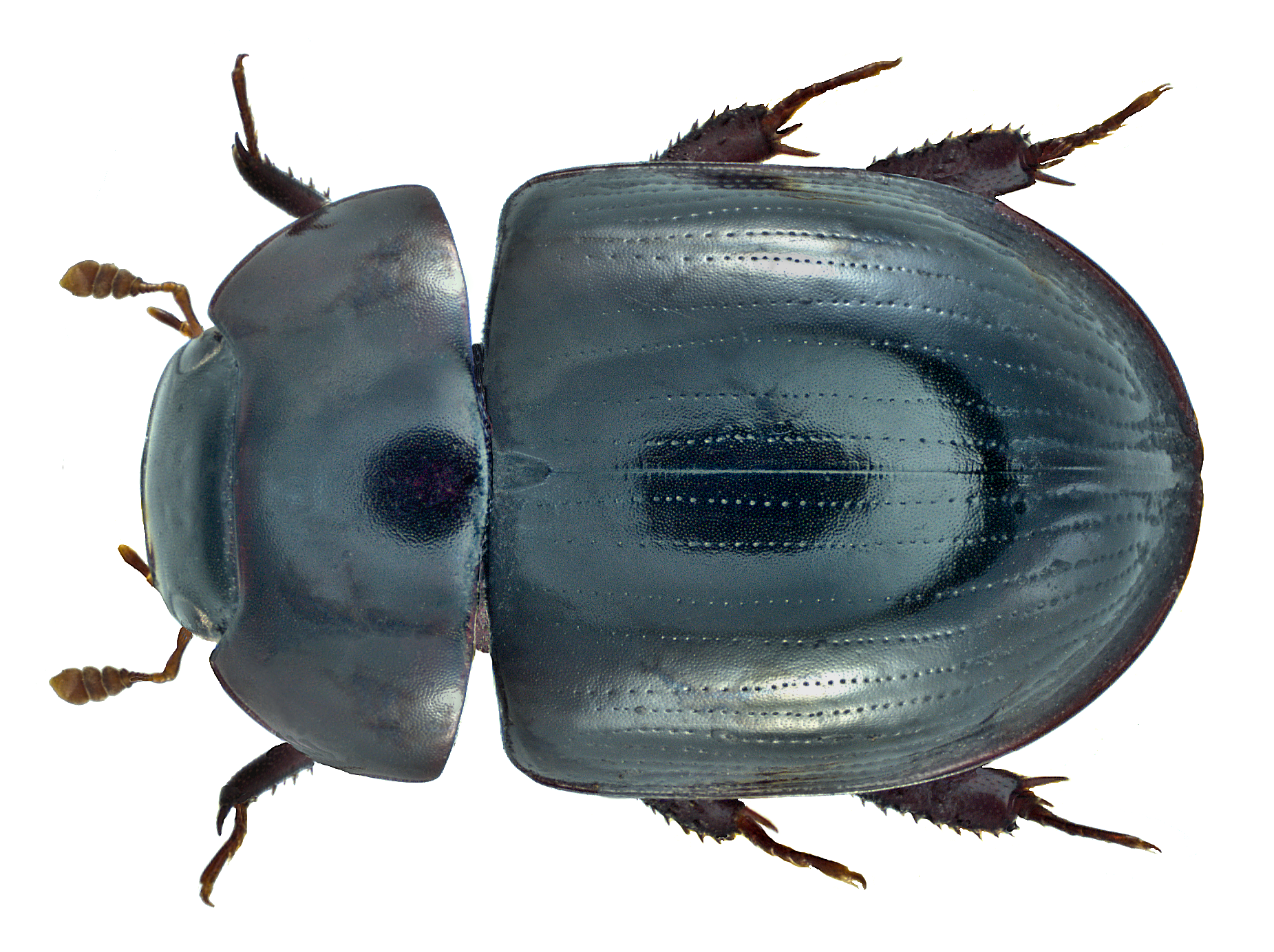
Dactylosternum hydrophiloides

== Species ==
These 23 species belong to the genus Dactylosternum:

- Dactylosternum abdominale (Fabricius, 1792)
- Dactylosternum advectum Horn, 1890
- Dactylosternum americanum (Mulsant, 1844)
- Dactylosternum auripes Fauvel, 1883
- Dactylosternum cacti (LeConte, 1855)
- Dactylosternum cayannum (Mulsant, 1844)
- Dactylosternum circumcinctum Fikáek, 2010
- Dactylosternum convexum (Castelnau, 1840)
- Dactylosternum corbetti Balfour-Browne, 1942
- Dactylosternum corporaali
- Dactylosternum cycloides Knisch, 1921
- Dactylosternum dispar (Sharp, 1882)
- Dactylosternum dytiscoides (Fabricius, 1775)
- Dactylosternum flavicorne (Mulsant, 1844)
- Dactylosternum fulgens Orchymont, 1937
- Dactylosternum grouvellei Guillebeau, 1894
- Dactylosternum helleri d'Orchymont, 1925
- Dactylosternum hydrophiloides (MacLeay, 1825)
- Dactylosternum kanakorum Fikáek, 2010
- Dactylosternum montaguei Balfour-Browne, 1939
- Dactylosternum picicorne (Mulsant, 1844)
- Dactylosternum subdepressum (Laporte, 1840)
- Dactylosternum subquadratum (Fairmaire, 1849)
