= Chetoneura =

Scientific classification
- Domain: Eukaryota
- Kingdom: Animalia
- Phylum: Arthropoda
- Class: Insecta
- Order: Diptera
- Family: Keroplatidae
- Genus: Chetoneura; Colless, 1962

Genus of flies

Chetoneura is a genus of flies belonging to the family Keroplatidae.

Species:

- Chetoneura cavernae Colless, 1962
- Chetoneura shennonggongensis Amorim & Niu, 2008
