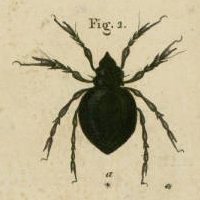
- Notaspis corynopus

Scientific classification
- Kingdom: Animalia
- Phylum: Arthropoda
- Subphylum: Chelicerata
- Class: Arachnida
- Order: Oribatida
- Family: Damaeidae
- Genus: Belba; Heyden, 1826

Type species
- Notaspis corynopus (Hermann, 1804)

= Belba =

Genus of mites

Belba is a genus of mites belonging to family Damaeidae. The genus was established by Carl von Heyden in 1826. Notaspis corynopus (Hermann, 1804) was the type species. Species that are part of the genus can be found in Eurasia and North America.

== Behaviour ==
Members of the genus Belba are fungivores. Some species have been concluded to prefer a narrow temperature range of 11 °C – 15 °C.

== List of species ==
The following species are considered to be part of the genus:

- Belba aberrans
- Belba aegrota
- Belba alpina
- Belba bartosi
- Belba crassisetosa
- Belba clavigera
- Belba compta
- Belba corynopus (Notaspis corynopus)
- Belba diversipilis
- Belba dubinini
- Belba gibba
- Belba globiceps
- Belba globipes
- Belba granulata
- Belba gratiosa
- Belba heterosetosa
- Belba helvetica
- Belba ignota
- Belba lengensdorfi
- Belba limasetosa
- Belba longipes
- Belba longisetosa
- Belba minor
- Belba minuta
- Belba mirabilis
- Belba mongolica
- Belba moraviae
- Belba obscura
- Belba pachytrichosa
- Belba paracorynopus
- Belba parvula
- Belba patelloides
- Belba piriformis
- Belba pseudocorynopus
- Belba pulchra
- Belba sculpta
- Belba sellnicki
- Belba serradeii
- Belba ursina
- Belba verrucosa
