= Ideoroncidae =

Ideoroncidae Temporal range: Cenomanian–Recent

Scientific classification
- Kingdom: Animalia
- Phylum: Arthropoda
- Subphylum: Chelicerata
- Class: Arachnida
- Order: Pseudoscorpiones
- Family: Ideoroncidae; Chamberlin, 1930

Genera
- See text

Family of arachnids

Ideoroncidae is a family of pseudoscorpions belonging to the order Pseudoscorpiones. Members of the family are known from Asia, Africa, western North America and South America.

Genera:

- Afroroncus Mahnert, 1981
- Albiorix Chamberlin, 1930
- Botswanoncus Harvey & Du Preez, 2014
- Dhanus Chamberlin, 1930
- Ideoroncus Balzan, 1887
- Mahnertius Harvey & Muchmore, 2013
- Muchmoreus Harvey, 2013
- Nannoroncus Beier, 1955
- Negroroncus Beier, 1931
- Pseudalbiorix Harvey, Barba, Muchmore & Pérez, 2007
- Shravana Chamberlin, 1930
- Sironcus Harvey, 2016
- Typhloroncus Muchmore, 1979
- Xorilbia Harvey & Mahnert, 2006

A fossil genus, Proalbiorix is known from the Cenomanian aged Burmese amber of Myanmar, which has close affinities with African and New World rather than Asian genera.
