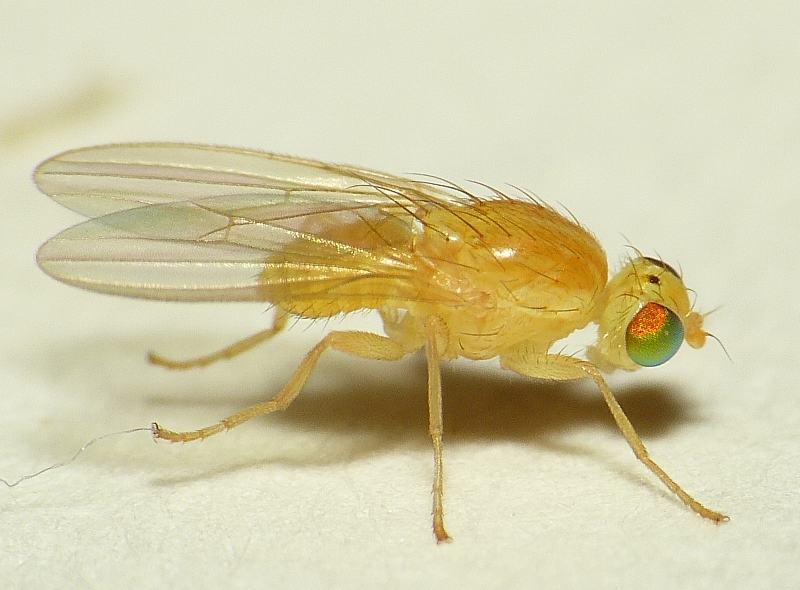
- Gymnochiromyia flavella

Scientific classification
- Domain: Eukaryota
- Kingdom: Animalia
- Phylum: Arthropoda
- Class: Insecta
- Order: Diptera
- Family: Chyromyidae
- Genus: Gymnochiromyia; Hendel, 1933

= Gymnochiromyia =

Genus of flies

Gymnochiromyia is a genus of flies belonging to the family Chyromyidae.

The genus has almost cosmopolitan distribution.

Species:

- Gymnochiromyia concolor (Malloch, 1914)
- Gymnochiromyia dubia (Lamb, 1914)
- Gymnochiromyia fallax Ebejer, 1998
- Gymnochiromyia flavella (Zetterstedt, 1848)
- Gymnochiromyia fulvipyga Ebejer, 2001
- Gymnochiromyia hawaiiensis Hardy, 1980
- Gymnochiromyia homobifida Carles-Tolra, 2001
- Gymnochiromyia inermis (Collin, 1933)
- Gymnochiromyia mihalyii Soos, 1979
- Gymnochiromyia nigridorsum (Malloch, 1925)
- Gymnochiromyia nigrimana (Malloch, 1914)
- Gymnochiromyia punctata Ebejer, 1996
- Gymnochiromyia seminitens Hendel, 1933
- Gymnochiromyia sexspinosa (Lamb, 1914)
- Gymnochiromyia tschirnhausi Ebejer, 2018
- Gymnochiromyia zernyi (Czerny, 1929)
