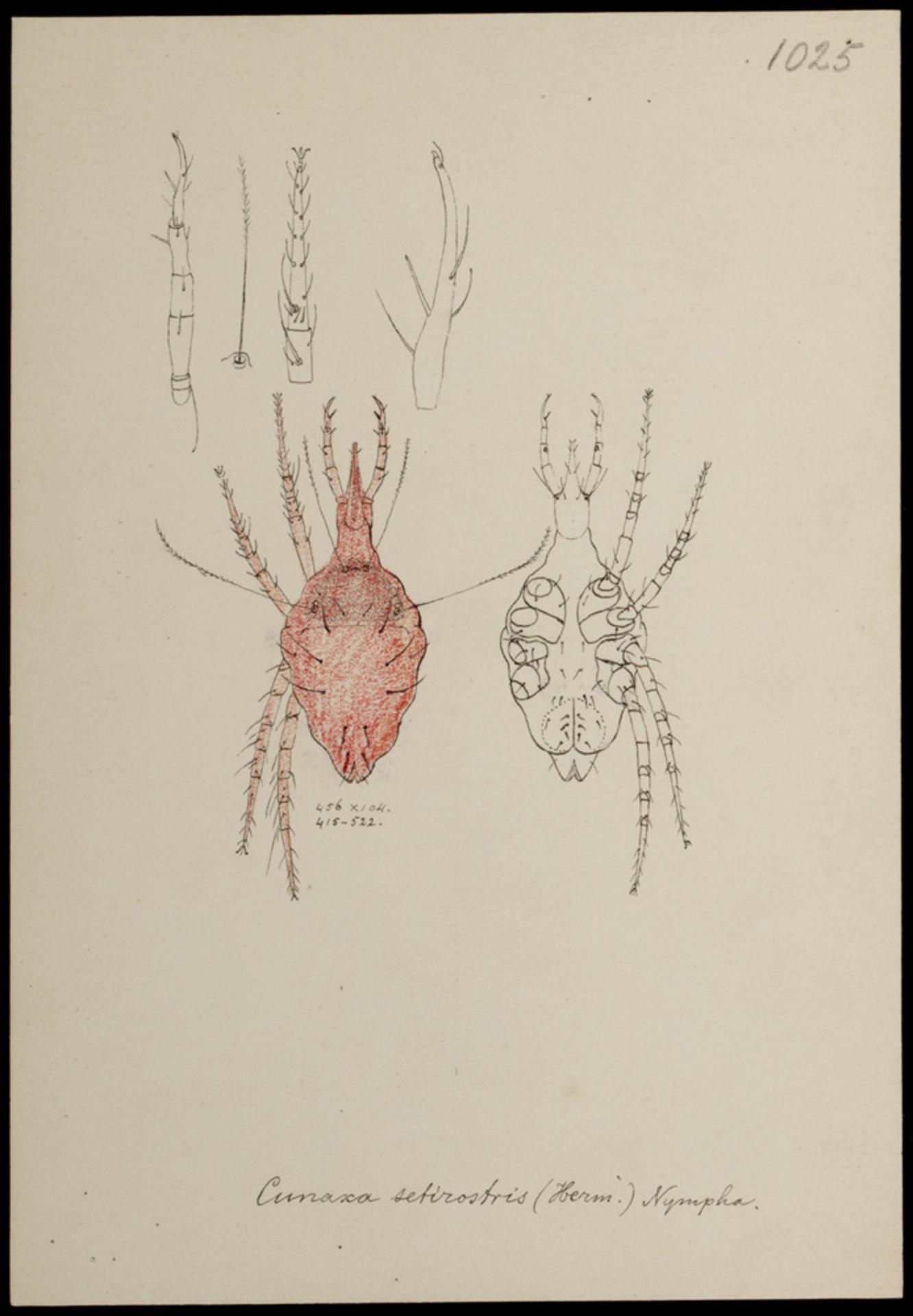
- Cunaxa setirostris

Scientific classification
- Kingdom: Animalia
- Phylum: Arthropoda
- Subphylum: Chelicerata
- Class: Arachnida
- Order: Trombidiformes
- Family: Cunaxidae
- Genus: Cunaxa von Heyden, 1826

= Cunaxa (mite) =

Genus of mites

Cunaxa is a genus of predatory mites in the family Cunaxidae. There are at least 50 described species in Cunaxa.

== Species ==
- Cunaxa anacardae Gupta, 1992
- Cunaxa anomala Khaustov & Kuznetzov, 1998
- Cunaxa bashiri Bashir & Afzal, 2009
- Cunaxa bochkovi Khaustov & Kuznetzov, 1998
- Cunaxa brevicrura Den Heyer, 1979
- Cunaxa breviscuta Luxton, 1982
- Cunaxa capreolus (Berlese, 1890)
- Cunaxa carina Den Heyer, 1979
- Cunaxa clusus Bashir & Afzal, 2009
- Cunaxa cogonae Corpuz-Raros & Garcia, 1995
- Cunaxa crista Gupta & Paul, 1985
- Cunaxa curassavica Gupta & Paul, 1985
- Cunaxa dentata Sergeyenko, 2003
- Cunaxa dotos Bashir & Afzal, 2009
- Cunaxa doxa Chaudhri & Abkar, 1985
- Cunaxa elaphus (Dugès, 1834)
- Cunaxa eupatoriae Chinniah & Mohanasundaram, 2001
- Cunaxa evansi Smiley, 1992
- Cunaxa gazella (Berlese, 1916)
- Cunaxa gordeevae Sergeyenko, 2009
- Cunaxa grobleri Den Heyer, 1979
- Cunaxa guanotoleranta Sergeyenko, 2009
- Cunaxa hermanni Den Heyer, 1979
- Cunaxa heterostriata Khaustov & Kuznetzov, 1998
- Cunaxa jatoiensis Bashir & Afzal, 2006
- Cunaxa lamberti Den Heyer, 1979
- Cunaxa leuros Bashir, Afzal, Ashfaq, Abkar & Ali, 2010
- Cunaxa lodhranensis Bashir & Afzal, 2009
- Cunaxa luzonica Corpuz-Raros & Garcia, 1995
- Cunaxa maculata Sergeyenko, 2009
- Cunaxa mageei Smiley, 1992
- Cunaxa magniferae Gupta, 1992
- Cunaxa magoebaensis Den Heyer, 1979
- Cunaxa mahmoodi Bashir & Afzal, 2009
- Cunaxa meiringi Den Heyer, 1979
- Cunaxa mercedesae Corpuz-Raros & Garcia, 1995
- Cunaxa nankanaensis Bashir, Afzal, Ashfaq, Raza & Kamran, 2011
- Cunaxa neogazella Smiley, 1992
- Cunaxa okaraensis Bashir & Afzal, 2009
- Cunaxa paludicola (Koch, 1838)
- Cunaxa pantabanganensis Corpuz-Raros & Garcia, 1995
- Cunaxa papuliphora Sergeyenko, 2009
- Cunaxa patpakanensis Bashir & Afzal, 2009
- Cunaxa potchensis Den Heyer, 1979
- Cunaxa prinia Gupta & Paul, 1985
- Cunaxa rafiqi Bashir, Afzal, Ashfaq, Abkar & Ali, 2010
- Cunaxa romblonensis Corpuz-Raros & Garcia, 1995
- Cunaxa sagax (Koch, 1836)
- Cunaxa setirostris (Hermann, 1804)
- Cunaxa sordwanaensis Den Heyer, 1979
- Cunaxa stabulicola (Koch, 1838)
- Cunaxa sudakensis Khaustov & Kuznetzov, 1998
- Cunaxa terrula Den Heyer, 1979
- Cunaxa thailandicus Smiley, 1992
- Cunaxa thessalica Sionti & Papadoulis, 2003
- Cunaxa veracruzana Baker & Hoffmann, 1949
- Cunaxa violaphila Sergeyenko, 2009
- Cunaxa womersleyi Baker & Hoffmann, 1948
- Cunaxa yaylensis Sergeyenko, 2009
