= Paraphrynus carolynae =

Scientific classification
- Kingdom: Animalia
- Phylum: Arthropoda
- Subphylum: Chelicerata
- Class: Arachnida
- Order: Amblypygi
- Family: Phrynidae
- Genus: Paraphrynus
- Species: P. carolynae

Binomial name
- Paraphrynus carolynae de Armas (2012)

Species of tailless whip scorpion

Paraphrynus carolynae is a species of tailless whip scorpion from Mexico. The specific epithet carolynae was chosen to honor the arachnologist Carolyn L. Mullinex.

== Description ==
P. carolynae is usually between 13 and 20mm (0.51-0.79in) total body length. Coloration is reddish-brown overall, with a darkened carapace.

== Distribution and Habitat ==
P. carolynae is distributed within Mexico in Sonora, Michoacán, and Morelos. A population ranging into the Southwestern United States was previously identified as P. carolynae but is now considered a distinct species, Paraphrynus tokdod.

=== Ecology ===
Like all tailless whip scorpions, this species is largely nocturnal and feeds on smaller arthropods it feels with its antenniform legs.

== Taxonomy ==
Populations from the Mexican state of Sonora and the U.S. state of Arizona were previously referred to as Paraphrynus mexicanus, but de Armas (2012) assigned the name Paraphrynus carolynae based on morphological differences. In 2025, the population from Arizona was split into another new species, Paraphrynus tokdod.
