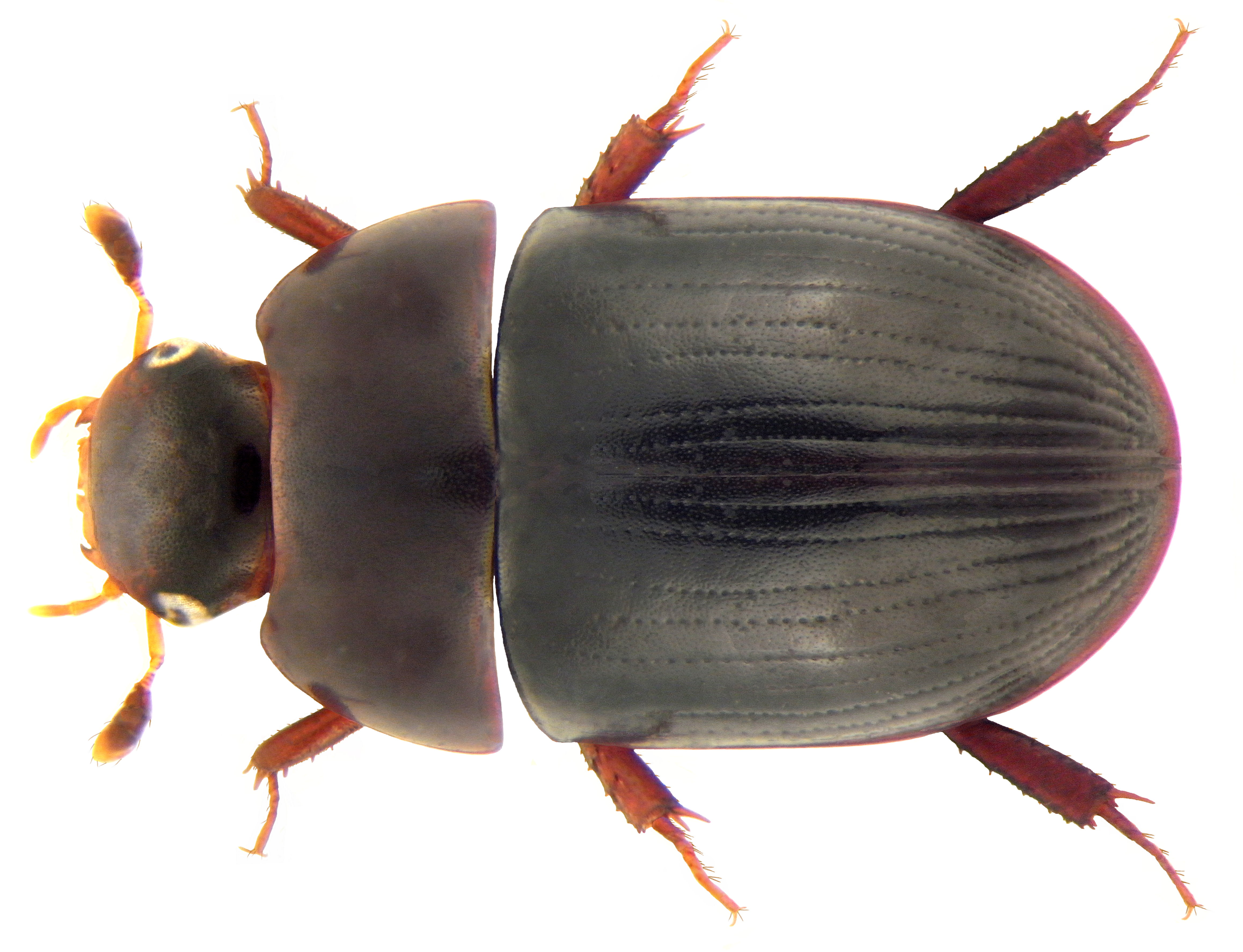

Scientific classification
- Kingdom: Animalia
- Phylum: Arthropoda
- Clade: Pancrustacea
- Class: Insecta
- Order: Coleoptera
- Suborder: Polyphaga
- Infraorder: Staphyliniformia
- Family: Hydrophilidae
- Genus: Dactylosternum
- Species: D. abdominale

Binomial name
- Dactylosternum abdominale (Fabricius, 1792)

= Dactylosternum abdominale =

Species of beetle

Dactylosternum abdominale is a species of water scavenger beetle in the family Hydrophilidae. It is found in Africa, Australia, the Caribbean Sea, Europe and Northern Asia (excluding China), Central America, North America, Oceania, South America, and Southern Asia.
