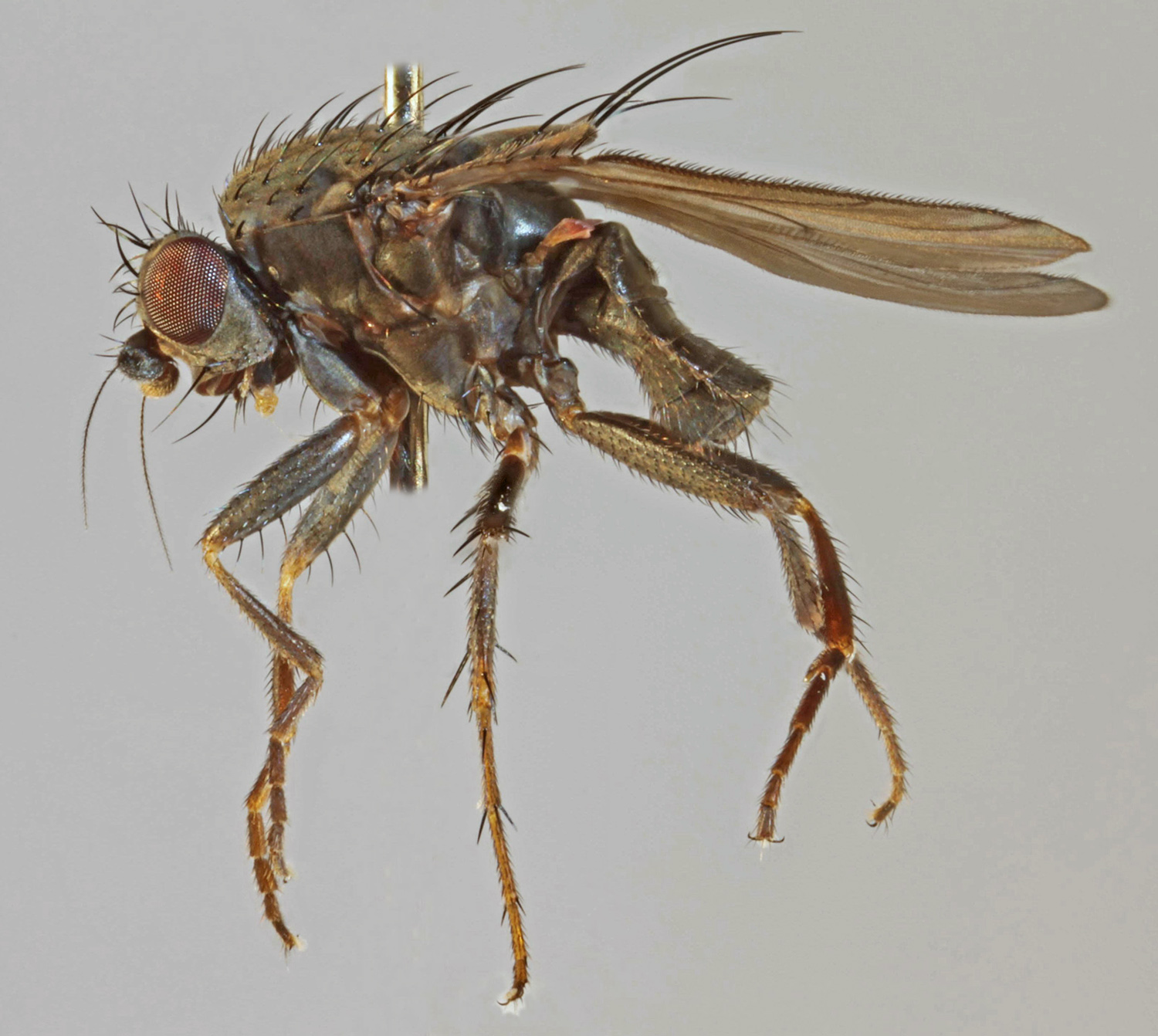
- Leptocera fontinalis

Scientific classification
- Kingdom: Animalia
- Phylum: Arthropoda
- Class: Insecta
- Order: Diptera
- Family: Sphaeroceridae
- Subfamily: Limosininae
- Genus: Leptocera; Olivier, 1813

Type species
- Leptocera nigra Olivier, 1813

Synonyms
- Lotomyia Lioy, 1864; Paracollinella Duda, 1924; Skottsbergia Enderlein, 1938; Paracolinella Vanschuytbroeck, 1970

= Leptocera =

Genus of flies

Leptocera is a genus of flies belonging to the family Sphaeroceridae.

== Species ==
- L. aequilimbata Duda, 1925
- L. alpina Roháček, 1982
- L. atra (Vanschuytbroeck, 1951)
- L. basilewskyi (Vanschuytbroeck, 1962)
- L. boruvkai Roháček, 1993
- L. caenosa (Rondani, 1880)
- L. chambii (Vanschuytbroeck, 1950)
- L. cultellipennis (Enderlein, 1938)
- L. decisetosa (Vanschuytbroeck, 1950)
- L. dicrofulva Buck, 2009
- L. duplicata Richards, 1955
- L. dyscola Roháček & Papp, 1983
- L. elgonensis Richards, 1938
- L. ellipsipennis Richards, 1955
- L. equispina Papp, 1973
- L. erratica Buck, 2009
- L. erythrocera (Becker, 1920)
- L. finalis (Collin, 1956)
- L. fontinalis (Fallén, 1826)
- L. fulva (Malloch, 1912)
- L. gongylotheca Buck, 2009
- L. hexadike Buck, 2009
- L. insularum Buck, 2009
- L. kanata Buck, 2009
- L. koningsbergeri Duda, 1925
- L. kovacsi Duda, 1925
- L. longilimbata Buck, 2009
- L. marginata (Adams, 1905)
- L. melanaspis (Bezzi, 1908)
- L. mendozana Richards, 1931
- L. neocurvinervis Richards, 1931
- L. neofinalis Buck, 2009
- L. neovomerata Buck, 2009
- L. nigra Olivier, 1813
- L. nigrolimbata Duda, 1925
- L. oldenbergi (Duda, 1918)
- L. papallacta Buck, 2009
- L. parafinalis Papp, 1973
- L. parallelipennis Buck, 2009
- L. paranigrolimbata Duda, 1925
- L. plax Buck, 2009
- L. posteronitens Buck, 2009
- L. prolixofulva Buck, 2009
- L. rhadinofulva Buck, 2009
- L. salatigae (de Meijere, 1914)
- L. schlingeri Richards, 1963
- L. sphaerotheca Buck, 2009
- L. spinitarsata Papp, 1973
- L. stenodiscoidalis Papp, 1991
- L. sterniloba Roháček, 1983
- L. tapanti Buck, 2009
- L. tenuispina Buck, 2009
- L. vomerata Roháček & Papp, 1983
