= Dhanu =

Dhanu may refer to:

- Dhanu (festival), a Hindu religious festival associated with the Dhanu jatra
- Dhanu (month), a month in the Hindu calendar
- Kalaivani Rajaratnam or Dhanu, the assassin of Rajiv Gandhi
- Dhanu River, a river in Bangladesh
- Dhanu Rosadhe (born 1989), Indonesian footballer
- Dhanus (disambiguation), several entities in ancient Indian culture

== See also ==
- Dhaŋu, an Australian Aboriginal Yolŋu language
- Dahanu, a town in Maharashtra, India
