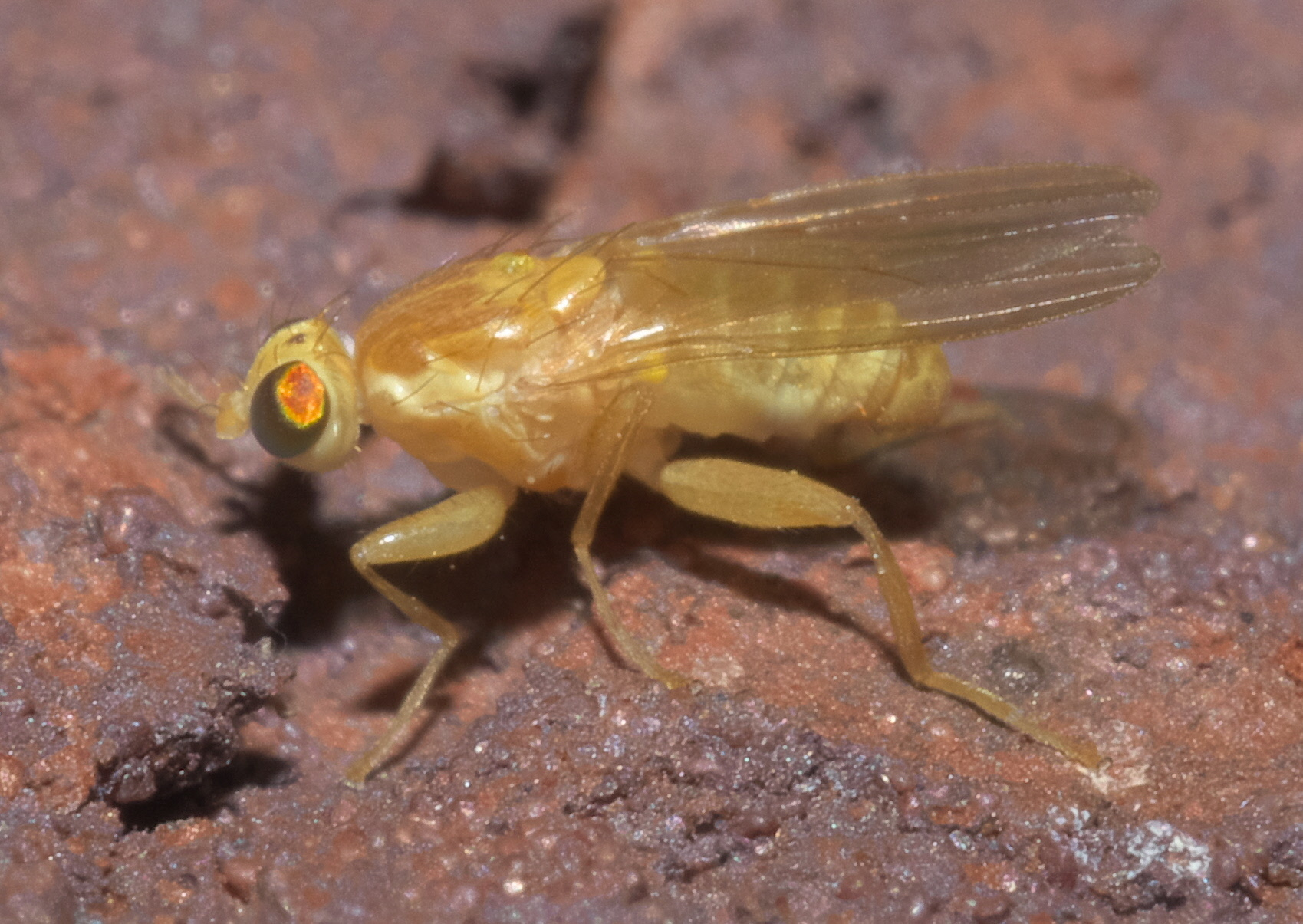
- Chyromya femorella, Oklahoma

Scientific classification
- Domain: Eukaryota
- Kingdom: Animalia
- Phylum: Arthropoda
- Class: Insecta
- Order: Diptera
- Family: Chyromyidae
- Genus: Chyromya; Robineau-Desvoidy, 1830

Synonyms
- Chiromya Agassiz, 1845; Chiromyia Agassiz, 1846; Chyromyia Schiner, 1863; Lisella Robineau-Desvoidy, 1830; Pelethophila Hagenbach, 1822; Scyphella Robineau-Desvoidy, 1830; Siphella Rondani, 1874

= Chyromya =

Genus of flies

Chyromya is a genus of golden flies in the family Chyromyidae. There are about 12 described species in Chyromya.

== Species ==
These 12 species belong to the genus Chyromya:

- Chyromya apicalis Czerny, 1929
- Chyromya britannica Gibbs, 2007
- Chyromya femorella (Fallen, 1820)
- Chyromya flava (Linnaeus, 1758)
- Chyromya hedia Hendel, 1913
- Chyromya hirtiscutellatum (Lamb, 1914)
- Chyromya intermedia Ebejer, 2001
- Chyromya miladae Andersson, 1976
- Chyromya nitescens Frey, 1958
- Chyromya oppidana (Scopoli, 1763)
- Chyromya pumilio (Meijere, 1904)
- Chyromya robusta (Hendel, 1931)
