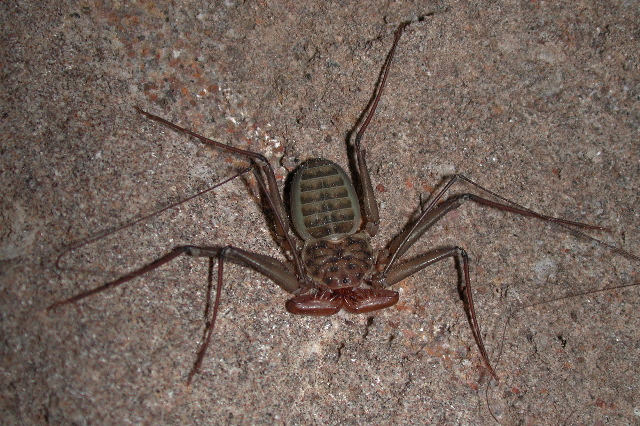
- Paraphrynus mexicanus

Scientific classification
- Kingdom: Animalia
- Phylum: Arthropoda
- Subphylum: Chelicerata
- Class: Arachnida
- Order: Amblypygi
- Family: Phrynidae
- Genus: Paraphrynus; Moreno, 1940

= Paraphrynus =

Genus of tailless whip scorpions

Paraphrynus is a genus of whip spiders, also known as tailless whip scorpions (order Amblypygi), of the family Phrynidae. It is distributed from the southwestern United States to Central America, including several Caribbean islands. Most species are endemic to Mexico.

The genus was first described as Hemiphrynus by Reginald Pocock in 1902. Since there was already a beetle genus named Hemiphrynus, A. Moreno renamed the genus Paraphrynus in 1940. The genus was revised by Carolyn Mullinex in 1975.

== Description ==
The pedipalp tibia has nine or ten (rarely more) dorsal spines. Between the two longest spines are two shorter ones. This pattern of spines distinguishes Paraphrynus from the closely related genus Phrynus, which has only one spine between the two longest spines.

== Taxonomy ==
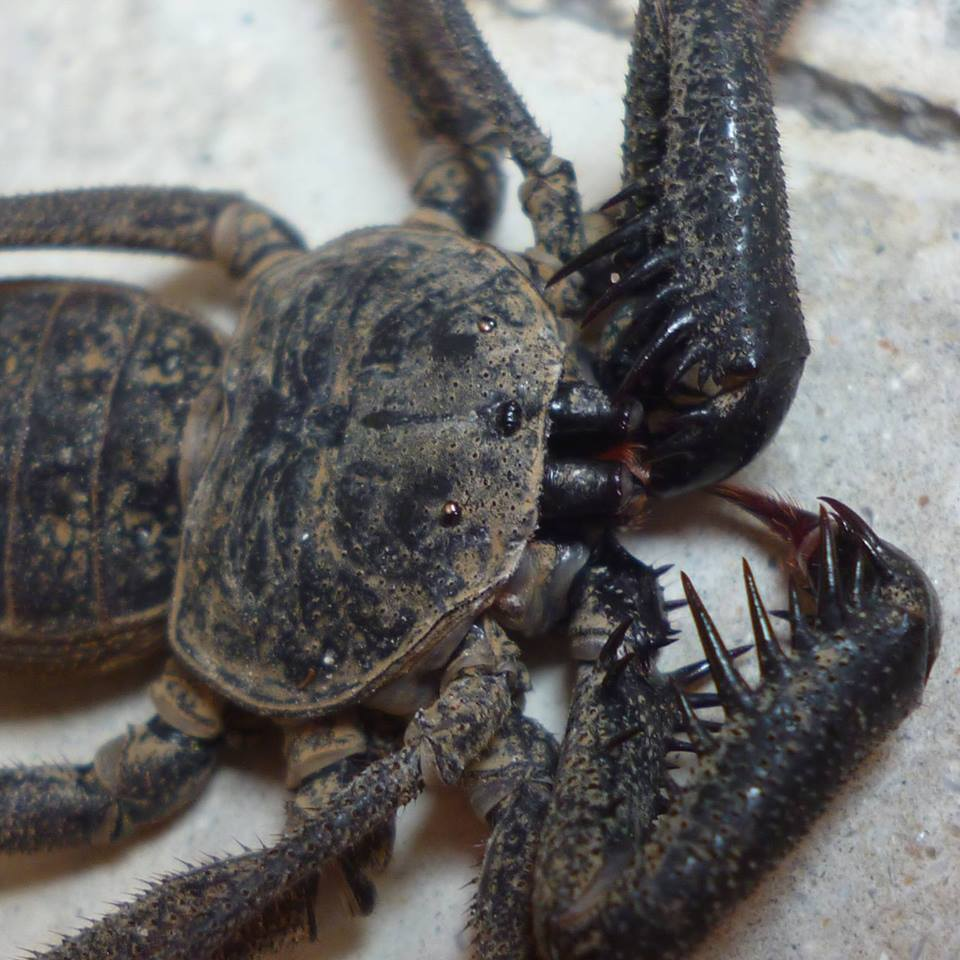
A female P. pococki showing palpal spines.

This genus can be told apart from Phrynus by observing the patella of the pedipalp, which in Phrynus has one small spine between the two largest, while Paraphrynus has two. It can be distinguished from Acanthophrynus by its lack of spines in the frontal region of the carapace. The remaining member of the family Phrynidae, Heterophrynus, does not seem to be sympatric with any species of this genus.

There are about 18 species:

- Paraphrynus aztecus (Pocock, 1894)
- Paraphrynus baeops (Mullinex, 1975)
- Paraphrynus carolynae Armas, 2012
- Paraphrynus chacmool (Rowland, 1973)
- Paraphrynus chiztun (Rowland, 1973)
- Paraphrynus cubensis Quintero, 1983
- Paraphrynus emaciatus Mullinex, 1975
- Paraphrynus grubbsi Cokendolpher and Sissom, 2001
- Paraphrynus laevifrons (Pocock, 1894)
- Paraphrynus leptus Mullinex, 1975
- Paraphrynus macrops (Pocock, 1894)
- Paraphrynus maya Armas, Trujillo & Agreda 2017
- Paraphrynus mexicanus (Bilimek, 1867)
- Paraphrynus olmeca Armas & Trujillo 2018
- Paraphrynus pococki Mullinex, 1975
- Paraphrynus raptator (Pocock, 1902)
- Paraphrynus reddelli Mullinex, 1979
- Paraphrynus robustus (Franganillo, 1931)
- Paraphrynus tokdod (Cazzaniga and Prendini, 2024)
- Paraphrynus velmae Mullinex, 1975
- Paraphrynus viridiceps (Pocock, 1894)
- Paraphrynus williamsi Moreno, 1940

== Biology ==
Like other Amblypygi, the species in this genus are nocturnal predators that dwell in moist microenvironments. Some species are troglophiles and some are true troglobites. They feed upon insects and other arachnids. Paraphrynus have flattened bodies that are approximately 3/8” (3-11 mm) long, with spiny pedipalps and antennae-like legs referred to as antenniform legs. The front, first pair of legs are long filamentous or whip-like tips, while the other 3 pairs of legs are positioned to the side, crablike. The longer front legs are sensory organs that are used to "feel" about and locate its prey, which they then ensnare with the spiny pedipalps. Research conducted by biologists also found that the front legs of P. laevifronsis are used to navigate to their refuge prior to dawn, usually spending the night hunting for prey on the vertical surfaces of tree trunks in a neotropical environment.
