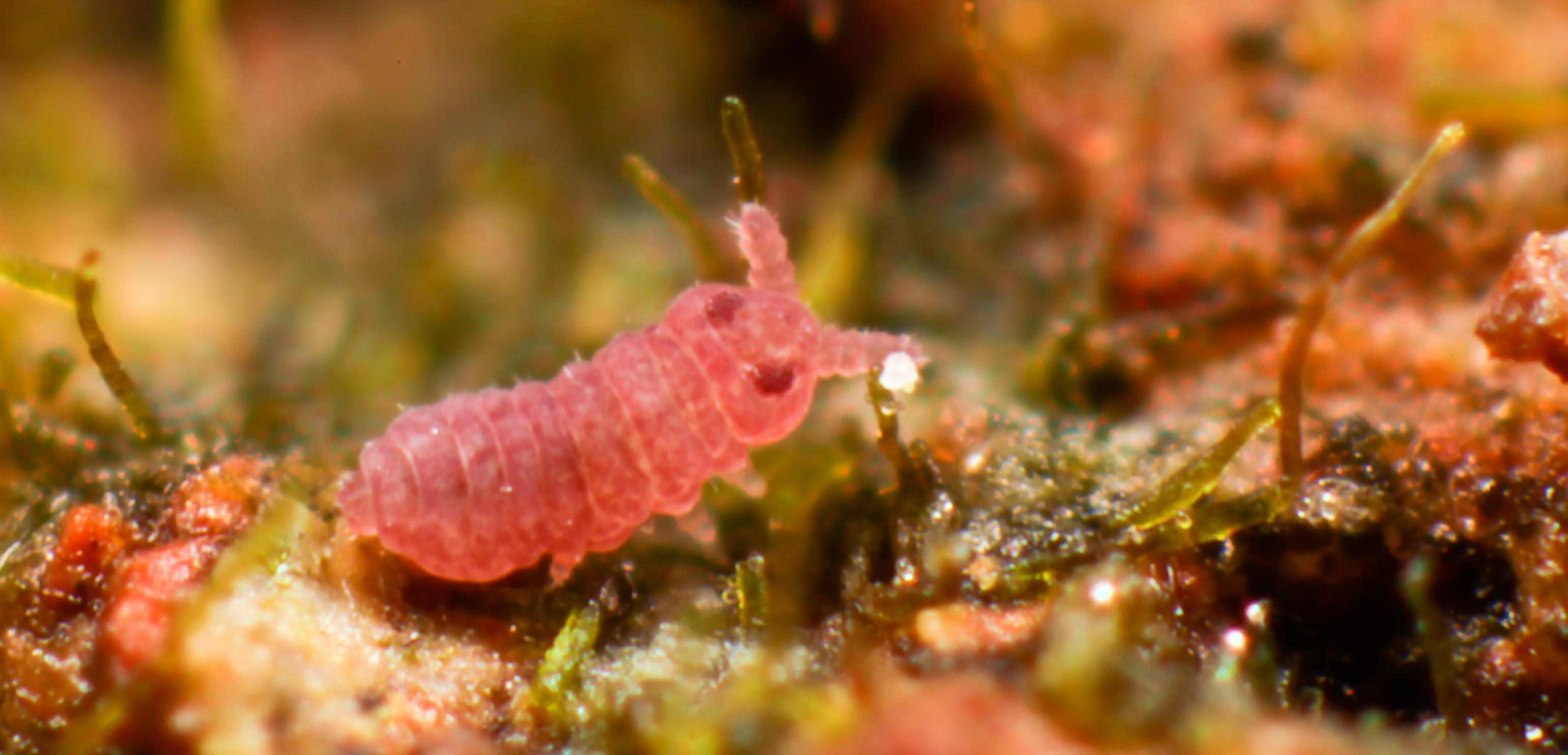
- Brachystomella parvula

Scientific classification
- Domain: Eukaryota
- Kingdom: Animalia
- Phylum: Arthropoda
- Class: Collembola
- Order: Poduromorpha
- Family: Brachystomellidae
- Genus: Brachystomella; Agren, 1903

= Brachystomella =

Genus of springtails

Brachystomella is a genus of springtails in the family Brachystomellidae. There are more than 20 described species in Brachystomella.

== Species ==
These 25 species belong to the genus Brachystomella:

- Brachystomella agrosa Wray, 1953
- Brachystomella arida Christiansen & Bellinger, 1980
- Brachystomella banksi (Maynard, 1951)
- Brachystomella contorta Denis, 1931
- Brachystomella curvula Gisin, 1948
- Brachystomella garayae
- Brachystomella hawaiiensis Yosii, 1965
- Brachystomella heo Christiansen & Bellinger, 1992
- Brachystomella hiemalis Yosii, 1956
- Brachystomella insulae Najt & Thibaud, 1988
- Brachystomella jeremiei Massoud & Thibaud, 1980
- Brachystomella kahakai Christiansen & Bellinger, 1992
- Brachystomella kiko Christiansen & Bellinger, 1992
- Brachystomella maritima Agren, 1903
- Brachystomella mauriesi Thibaud & Massoud, 1983
- Brachystomella momona Christiansen & Bellinger, 1992
- Brachystomella nubila Gisin, 1957
- Brachystomella parvula (Schaeffer, 1896)
- Brachystomella perraulti Thibaud & Najt, 1993
- Brachystomella porcus Denis, 1933
- Brachystomella quadrituberculata (Becker, 1905)
- Brachystomella septemoculata Denis, 1931
- Brachystomella stachi Mills, 1934
- Brachystomella unguilongus Najt & Thibaud, 1988
- Brachystomella villalobosi Cassagnau & Rapoport, 1962
