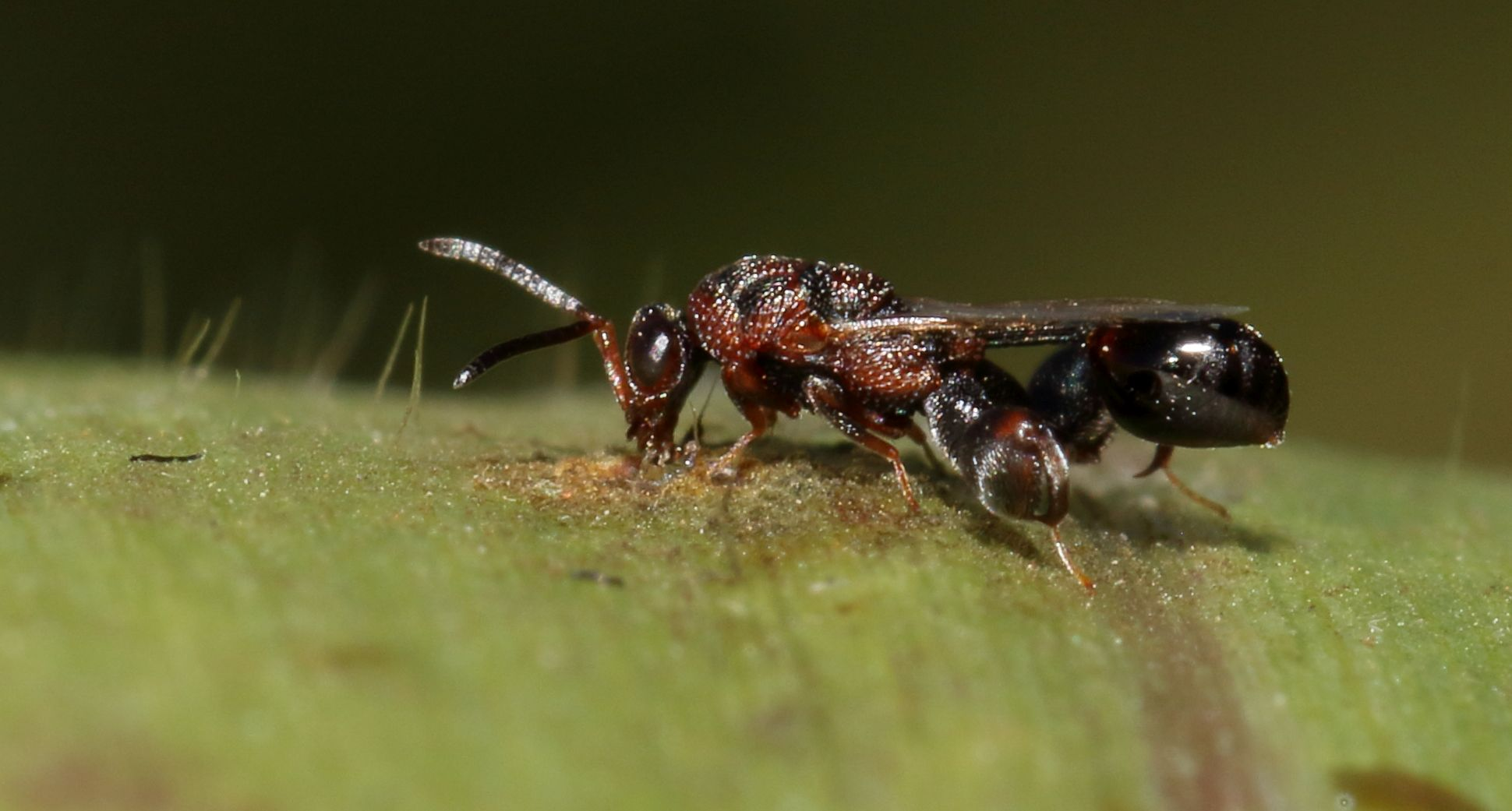

Scientific classification
- Kingdom: Animalia
- Phylum: Arthropoda
- Clade: Pancrustacea
- Class: Insecta
- Order: Hymenoptera
- Family: Chalcididae
- Genus: Epitranus; Walker, 1834

= Epitranus =

Genus of wasps

Epitranus is a genus of parasitoid wasps belonging to the family Chalcididae. This genus is the sole representative of the subfamily Epitraninae. Epitranus species are primarily distributed across Africa and Oceania. The genus has also been recorded in the Nearctic and Indomalayan regions, with Epitranus clavatus introduced there.

The first species of Epitranus to be transcribed was Epitranus clavatus, in 1804. A new species of Epitranus, Epitranus longicaudatus, was discovered in 2024.

Species:

- Epitranus albipennis (Walker, 1874)
- Epitranus aligarhensis (Shafee & Dutt, 1986)
- Epitranus anervosus (Steffan, 1957)
- Epitranus clavatus (Fabricius, 1804)
- Epitranus clypealis (Masi, 1943)
- Epitranus crassicornis (Boucek, 1982)
- Epitranus elongatulus (Motschulsky, 1863)
- Epitranus erythrogaster (Cameron, 1888)
- Epitranus formicarius (Walker, 1862)
- Epitranus nitens (Boucek, 1982)
- Epitranus observator (Walker, 1862)
- Epitranus ramnathi (Mani & Dubey, 1973)
- Epitranus ruptator (Walker, 1862)
- Epitranus sedlaceki (Boucek, 1982)
- Epitranus stantoni (Ashmead, 1904)
- Epitranus teleute (Walker, 1838)
- Epitranus umbripennis (Boucek, 1982)
- Epitranus vicinus (Boucek, 1982)
- Epitranus longicaudatus, (2024)
