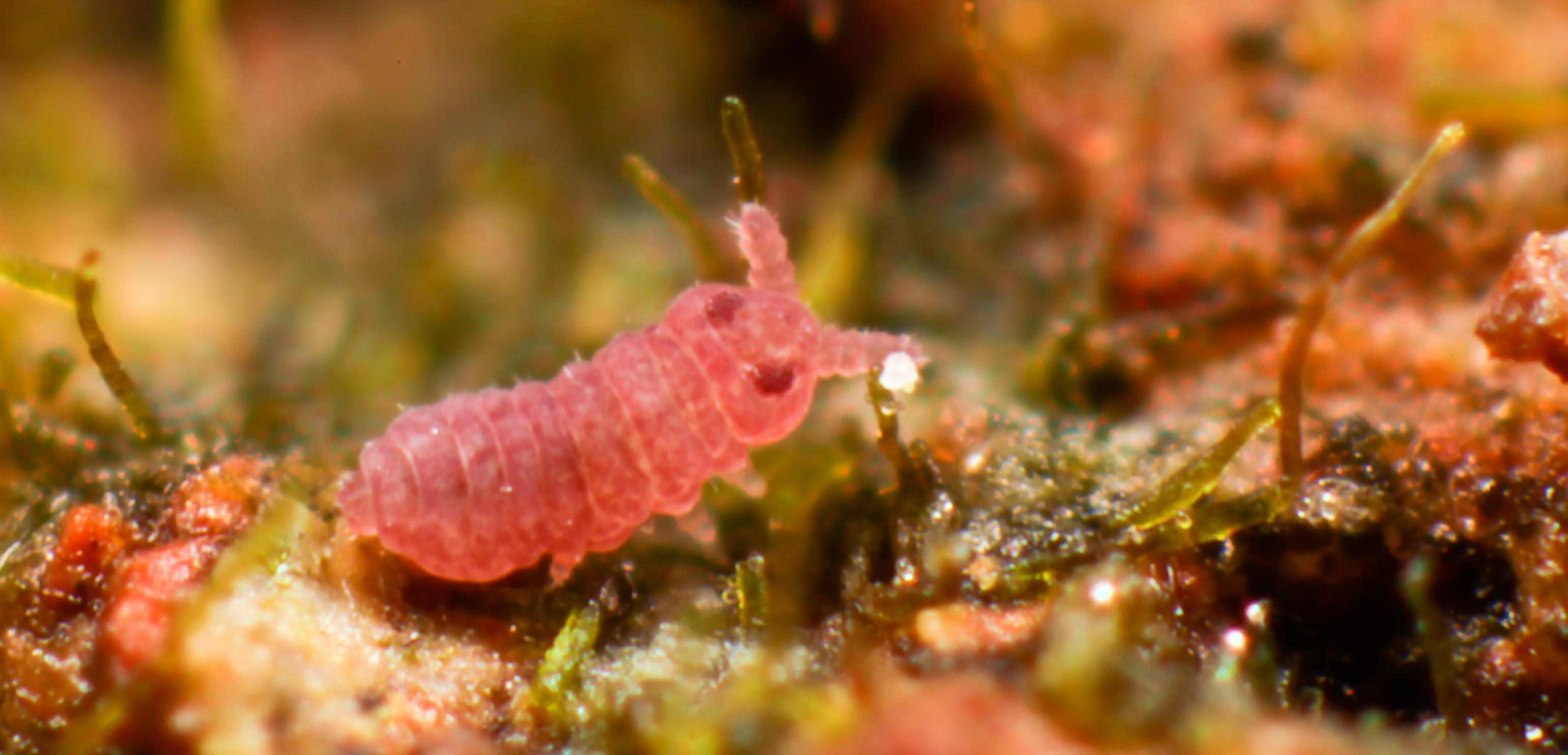
- Brachystomella parvula

Scientific classification
- Domain: Eukaryota
- Kingdom: Animalia
- Phylum: Arthropoda
- Class: Collembola
- Order: Poduromorpha
- Superfamily: Neanuroidea
- Family: Brachystomellidae

= Brachystomellidae =

Family of springtails

Brachystomellidae is a family of springtails in the order Poduromorpha. There are about 9 genera in Brachystomellidae.

== Genera ==
These nine genera belong to the family Brachystomellidae:

- Bonetella Stach, 1949
- Brachygastrura Rapoport, 1962
- Brachystomella Agren, 1903
- Brachystomellides Arlé, 1959
- Cassagnella Najt & Massoud, 1974
- Salvarella Greenslade & Najt, 1987
- Setanodosa Salmon, 1942
- Subclavontella Stach, 1949
- † Bellingeria Christiansen & Pike, 2002
