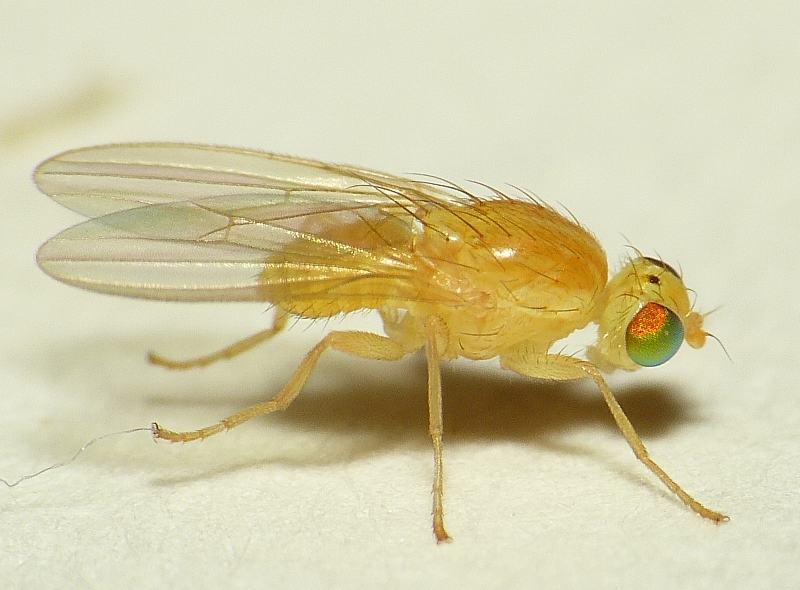
- Gymnochiromyia flavella

Scientific classification
- Kingdom: Animalia
- Phylum: Arthropoda
- Clade: Pancrustacea
- Class: Insecta
- Order: Diptera
- Superfamily: Sphaeroceroidea
- Family: Chyromyidae; Schiner, 1863

Genera
- Aphaniosoma Becker, 1903; Chyromya Robineau-Desvoidy, 1839; Gymnochiromyia Hendel, 1933; Others...

= Chyromyidae =

Family of flies

Chyromyidae are small to very small cyclorrhaphous, acalyptrate flies (Diptera) currently classified within the Heleomyzoidea by most authors. The majority have a pale yellow integument and bright iridescent green, red or purple eyes. The family is represented in all continents except Antarctica. There are about 150 named species in this family worldwide. There has been no comprehensive taxonomic study to elucidate the generic limits of species in the family. Currently, only four genera are recognised, but ongoing studies of the African species indicate that there are more.

== Biology ==
The biology of Chyromyidae is poorly known and no life history of any species has been elucidated. Adults are xerophilic and have been collected on flowering plants. There appears to be some association with bird and mammalian nests, though the nature of this association is not clear. Some species have been reared from guano and dung, from debris in tree hollows, and bird and mammalian nests.
