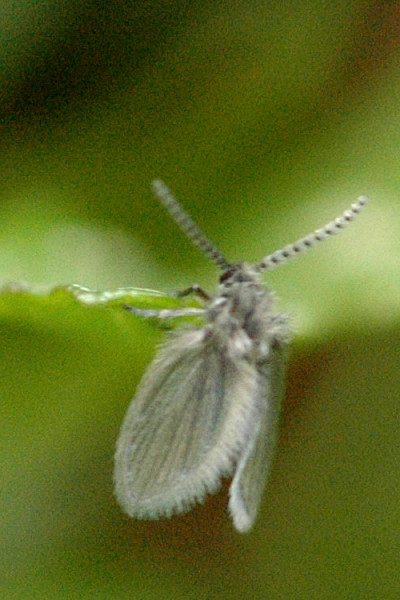
- Psychoda grisescens

Scientific classification
- Domain: Eukaryota
- Kingdom: Animalia
- Phylum: Arthropoda
- Class: Insecta
- Order: Diptera
- Family: Psychodidae
- Subfamily: Psychodinae
- Tribe: Psychodini
- Genus: Psychoda; Latreille, 1796

Diversity
- at least 370 species

= Psychoda =

Genus of flies

Psychoda is a genus of moth flies in the family Psychodidae. There are more than 400 described species in Psychoda.

== See also ==
- List of Psychoda species
