= Brinksway Caves =

Artificial caves in Stockport, Greater Manchester, England

- Maggie's Caves
- Location within Greater Manchester
- Location: Brinksway, Stockport, Greater Manchester, England
- OS grid: SJ8804390002
- Coordinates: 53°24′23″N 2°10′48″W
- Geology: Sandstone

The Brinksway Caves, also known as Maggie's Caves, are a group of artificial caves on Brinksway, beside the River Mersey in Stockport, Greater Manchester, England. They were excavated by workers cutting into naturally eroding sandstone on the Cheadle side of the river. Dating back to at least the 17th century, they have been expanded and used for various purposes, including industrial activity in the 19th century and as air-raid shelters during the Second World War. In the present day they are occasionally used as informal shelter, and their position above the river has led to several accidents.

== History ==
=== Toponymy ===
The Brinksway Caves take their name from Brinksway, a nearby road forming part of the A560. The road name derives from the Middle English brink, meaning an edge or bank, and the Old English weg, meaning a path; hence "a road at a brink".

=== Early history ===
The caves date back to at least 1670, and may have been excavated either by workers from the local corn mill tunnels or by the river wideners, both of whom had the tools and experience to create such spaces. They are also believed to have been enlarged by navvies working on the Stockport Viaduct, although this was likely an expansion of a pre-existing minor cave network. The caves were used as accommodation by some of the workers, who were unable to obtain lodging due to low pay.

Following the construction of the viaduct, the caves began to be used for industrial purposes. An 1881 query to the Stockport Advertiser noted that they had served as a manufactory for 30 years. In 1851, the caves were used as a distillery for purifying gas tar to produce naphtha, and a pipe-maker was also known to have worked there.

=== Contemporary history ===
Shortly before the Second World War, in 1938, sections of the caves were excavated to create air raid shelters, the first of which opened on 28 October 1939. As the threat of bombing had diminished by 1943, the shelters were no longer open every night. They were sealed off from the public in 1948.

In the present day, the caves are mainly used as a place of shelter by homeless people, with up to four individuals at a time. Owing to the hazardous location of the caves, several occupants have fallen into the river below. In 2015, a woman broke her spine after a 30-foot fall, requiring rescue by specialist firefighters.

== See also ==
- Stockport Air Raid Shelters
