= Stockport Air Raid Shelters =

World War II air raid shelters in Stockport, England

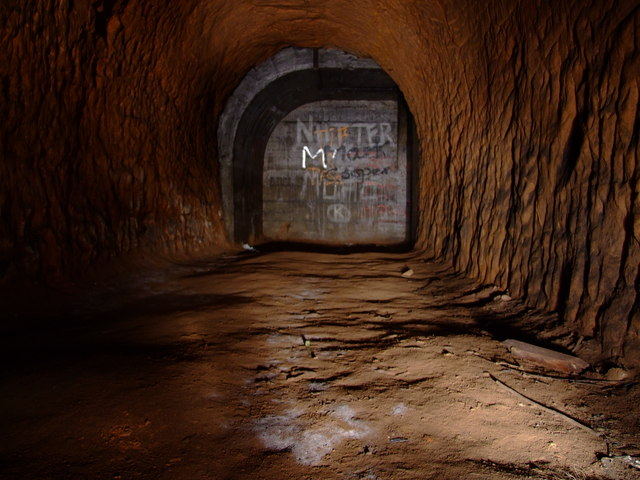
- Brinksway air raid shelter in 2006
- Established: 1996; 30 years ago
- Location: Stockport, Greater Manchester, England
- Coordinates: 53°24′35″N 2°09′39″W
- Owner: Stockport Council
- Website: Official website

The Stockport Air Raid Shelters are a system of almost 1 mile (1.6 km) of underground air raid shelters dug under Stockport, 6 miles (9.7 km) south of Manchester, to protect local inhabitants during Second World War air raids.

Four sets of underground air raid shelter tunnels for civilian use were dug into the red sandstone rock below the town centre. Preparation started in September 1938 and the first set of shelters were opened on 28 October 1939; Stockport was not bombed until 11 October 1940. The smallest of the tunnel shelters could accommodate 2,000 people and the largest 3,850. It was subsequently expanded to take up to 6,500 people.

In 1948 the shelters were sealed off from the public.

The largest of the Stockport Air Raid Shelters have been open to the public since 1996 as part of the town's museum service.

== Tunnels ==
=== Brinksway ===
The Brinksway shelter in Edgeley had a capacity for 1,085 bunks and seats for 1,735 people.

The excavations for the shelter expanded upon the 17th-century Brinksway Caves, which had previously been used as a shelter by navvies working on the Stockport Viaduct.

=== Chestergate ===
The Chestergate Shelter is a large and well known shelter system, originally able to accommodate 3,850 people before an expansion doubled the capacity to 6,500.

The Stockport shelter was formally opened on 28 October 1939 by the Mayoress of Stockport.

Due to the 'luxurious' amenities such as 16-seater chemical toilets, electric lighting and a canteen, local people dubbed the shelter the 'Chestergate Hotel'.

The shelter was opened to the public in 1996 as a museum. In 2014 Stockport Metropolitan Borough Council (SMBC) announced plans to cut funding to the museum and place it under an independent trust. In 2019 several staff were placed on redundancy notice, with plans announced to cut opening hours the following year. The cut in opening hours and the installation of admissions charges were set to go ahead in April 2020.

=== Dodge Hill ===
The Dodge Hill shelter in Heaton Norris had a capacity for around 2,000 people.

In 2013 two youths became trapped in the tunnels for over three hours, resulting in over 20 firefighters and seven emergency vehicles attending to rescue them. The following year, over 35 firefighters arrived to extinguish a fire possibly ignited by rough sleepers.

== In popular culture ==
The air raid shelters were depicted in the Scottish author Geraldine O'Neill's book The Nightingales in Mersey Square (2020), written under the pen name Lilly Robbins. The book centred around two trainee nurses during the arrival of 1,200 evacuees from Guernsey.

During her research for the book, O'Neill visited the Stockport Air Raid Shelters in order to ensure the work was authentic.
