= Air raid shelter =

Fortified wartime structures which protect citizens from airborne attacks

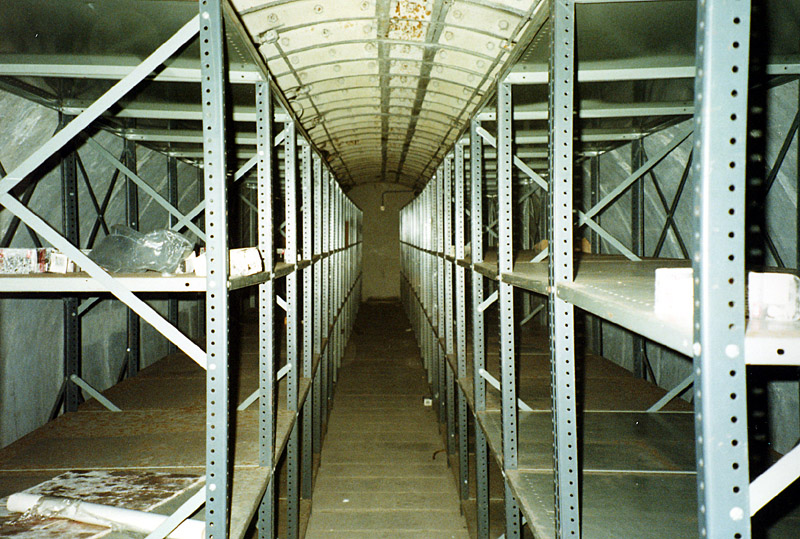
One of the London deep-level shelters, in Belsize Park

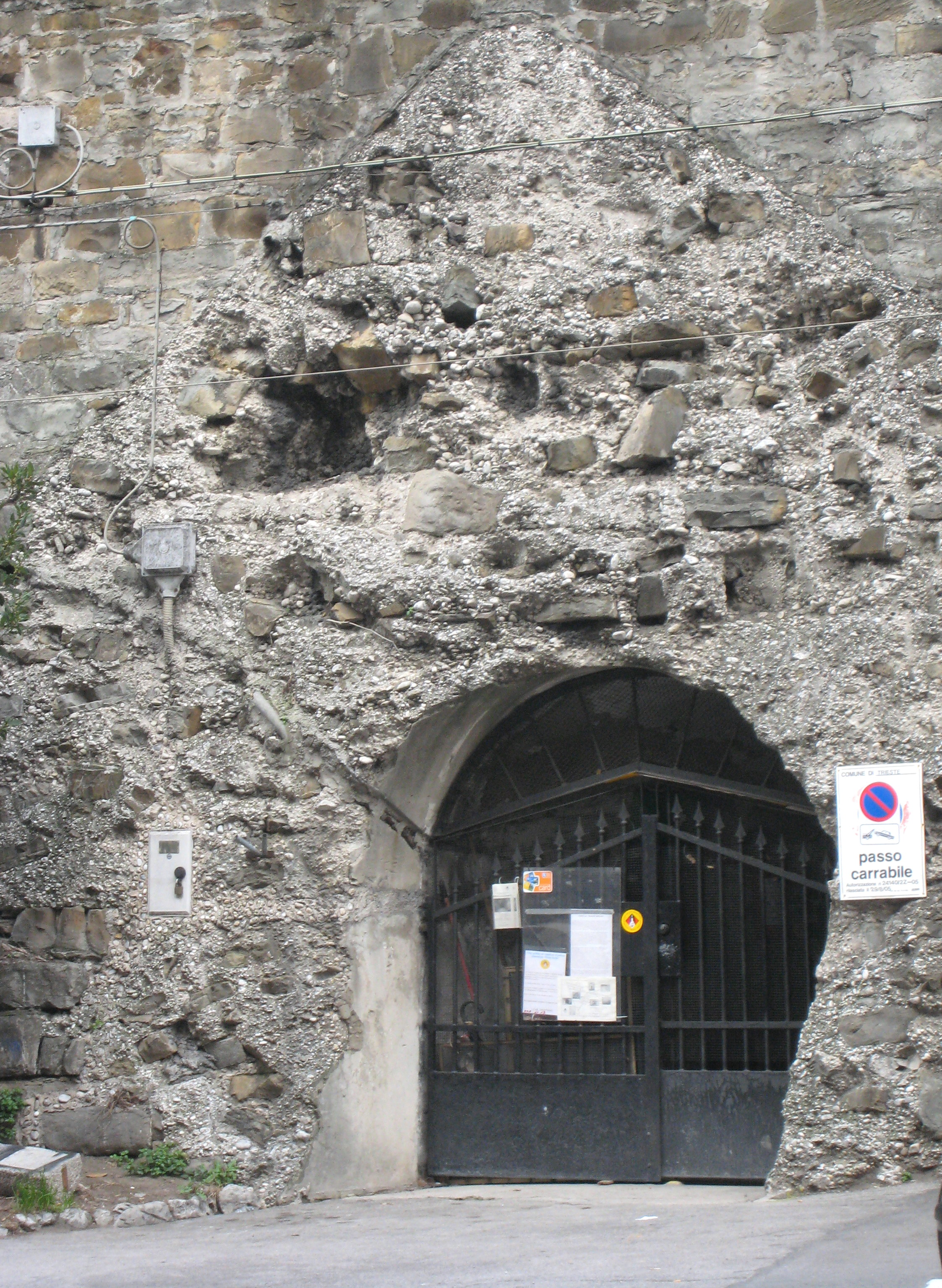
Kleines Berlin (transl. Little Berlin) is the complex of underground air-raid tunnels dating to World War II, which still exists in Trieste, Italy

Air raid shelters are structures for the protection of non-combatants as well as combatants against enemy attacks from the air. They are similar to bunkers in many regards, although they are not designed to defend against ground attack (but many have been used as defensive structures in such situations).

== History ==
=== Pre-World War II ===
Prior to World War II, in 1924, an Air Raid Precautions Committee was set up in the United Kingdom. For years, little progress was made with shelters because of the apparently irreconcilable conflict between the need to send the public underground for shelter and the need to keep them above ground for protection against gas attacks. In 1935, every city in the country was given a document to prepare air raid shelters. In February 1936 the Home Secretary appointed a technical Committee on Structural Precautions against Air Attack.

By November 1937, there had only been slow progress, because of a serious lack of data on which to base any design recommendations and the Committee proposed that the Home Office should have its own department for research into structural precautions, rather than relying on research work done by the Bombing Test Committee to support the development of bomb design and strategy. This proposal was eventually implemented in January 1939.

During the Munich crisis, local authorities dug trenches to provide shelter. After the crisis, the British Government decided to make these a permanent feature, with a standard design of precast concrete trench lining. Unfortunately these turned out to perform very poorly. They also decided to issue free to poorer households the Anderson shelter, and to provide steel props to create shelters in suitable basements.

=== World War II ===
During World War II, many types of structures were used as air raid shelters, such as cellars, Hochbunker (in Germany), basements, and underpasses. Bombing raids during World War I led the UK to build 80 specially adapted London Underground stations as shelters. However, during World War II, the government initially ruled out using these as shelters. After Londoners flooded into underground stations during The Blitz, the government reversed its policy. The UK began building street communal shelters as air raid shelters in 1940. Anderson shelters, designed in 1938 and built to hold up to six people, were in common use in the UK. Indoor shelters known as Morrison shelters were introduced as well.

Air raid shelters are still in use to some extent in various nations such as Spain, Switzerland, Israel, Singapore and Taiwan.

Air raid shelters were built to serve as protection against enemy air raids. Existing edifices designed for other functions, such as underground stations (tube or subway stations), tunnels, cellars in houses or basements in larger establishments and railway arches, above ground, were suitable for safeguarding people during air raids. A commonly used home shelter known as the Anderson shelter would be built in a garden and equipped with beds as a refuge from air raids.

In October 2026 a WWII-era air raid shelter in Quedlinburg Germany was unearthed during construction on a residential project and found to be largely intact.

== Types ==
=== Trenches ===
Air raid trenches are forms of trenches that began to be constructed for defensive purposes around the world after the creation of bomber aircraft. They were especially prevalent during World War II, but have also been used in other wars.

=== Cellars ===
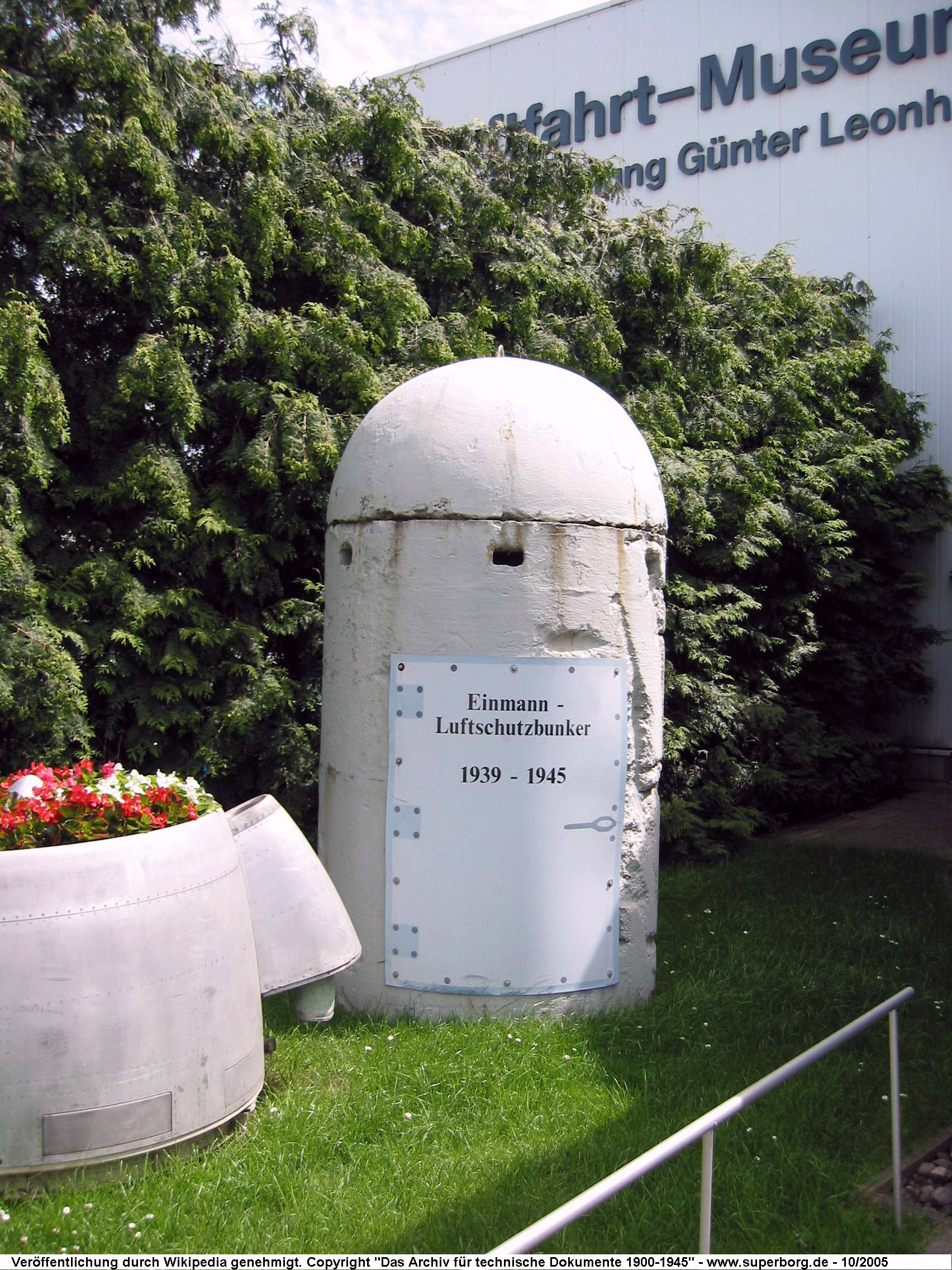
Single-person air raid shelter on display at the Günter Leonhardt aviation museum near Hanover, Germany

Cellars have always been much more important in Continental Europe than in the United Kingdom and especially in Germany almost all houses and apartment blocks have been and still are built with cellars. Air-raid precautions during World War II in Germany could be much more readily implemented by the authorities than was possible in the UK. All that was necessary was to ascertain that cellars were being prepared to accommodate all the residents of a building; that all the cellar hatch and window protections were in place; that access to the cellars was safe in the event of an air raid; that once inside, the occupants were secure for any incidents other than direct hits during the air raid and that means of escape were available.

The inadequacies of cellars and basements became apparent in the firestorms during the incendiary attacks on the larger German inner cities, especially Hamburg and Dresden. When burning buildings and apartment blocks above them collapsed in the raging winds (which could reach well over 800 °C or 1,470 °F), the occupants often became trapped in these basement shelters, which had also become overcrowded after the arrival of inhabitants from other buildings rendered unsafe in earlier attacks. Some occupants perished from heat stroke or carbon monoxide poisoning.

=== Hochbunker ===
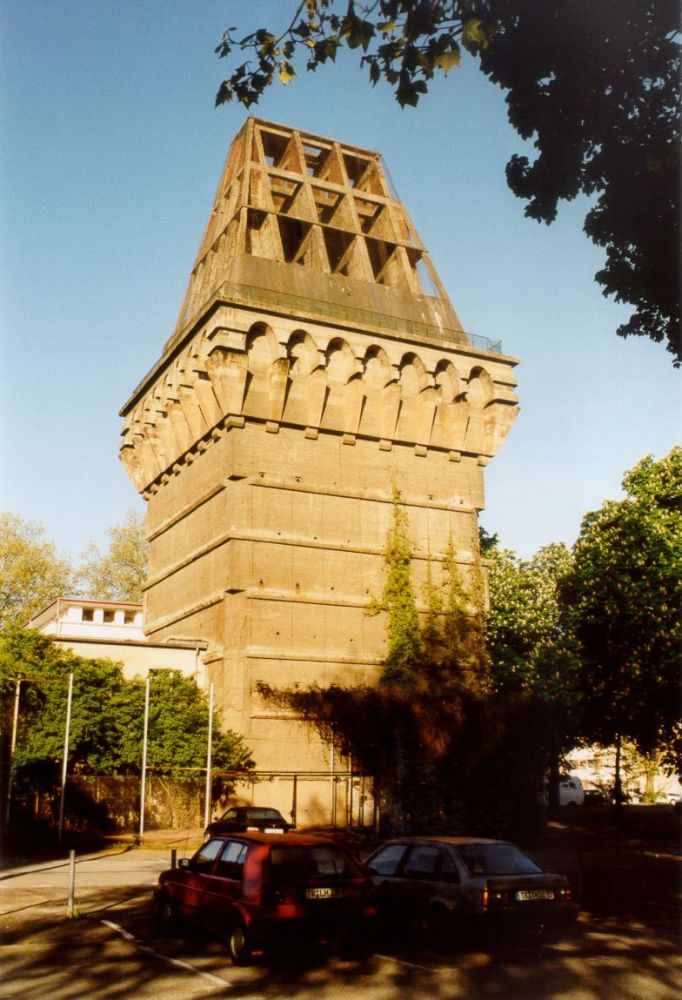
The Hochbunker in Trier

Hochbunker (lit. 'high-rise bunkers' or blockhouses), were a type of construction designed to relieve the pressure Nazi German authorities were facing to accommodate additional numbers of the population in high-density housing areas, as well as pedestrians on the streets during air raids. In contrast to other shelters, these buildings were considered completely bomb-proof. They had the advantage of being built upward, which was much cheaper than downward excavation. Hochbunker usually consisted of large concrete blocks above ground with walls between 1 and 1.5 metres (3 ft 3 in and 4 ft 11 in) thick and with huge lintels above doorways and openings. They often had a constant interior temperature of 7 to 10 °C (45 to 50 °F), which made them perfectly suitable for laboratories, both during and after the war. They were used to protect people, administrative centres, important archives and works of art.

Their structures took many forms: usually consisting of square blocks or of low, long rectangular or triangular shapes; straight towers of a square plan rising to great heights, or round tower-like edifices, even pyramidal constructions. Some of the circular towers contained helical floors that gradually curved their way upward within the circular walls. Many of these structures may still be seen. They have been converted into offices, storage space; some have even been adapted for hotels, hospitals and schools, as well as many other peacetime purposes. In Schöneberg, a block of flats was built over the Pallasstrasse air-raid shelter after World War II. During the Cold War, NATO used the shelter for food storage.

The cost of demolishing these edifices after the war would have been enormous, as the attempts at breaking up one of the six so-called Flak towers of Vienna proved. The attempted demolition caused no more than a crack in one of the walls of the tower, after which efforts were abandoned. Only the Zoo Tower in Berlin was successfully demolished.

Some Hochbunkers were repurposed by adding structures on top.

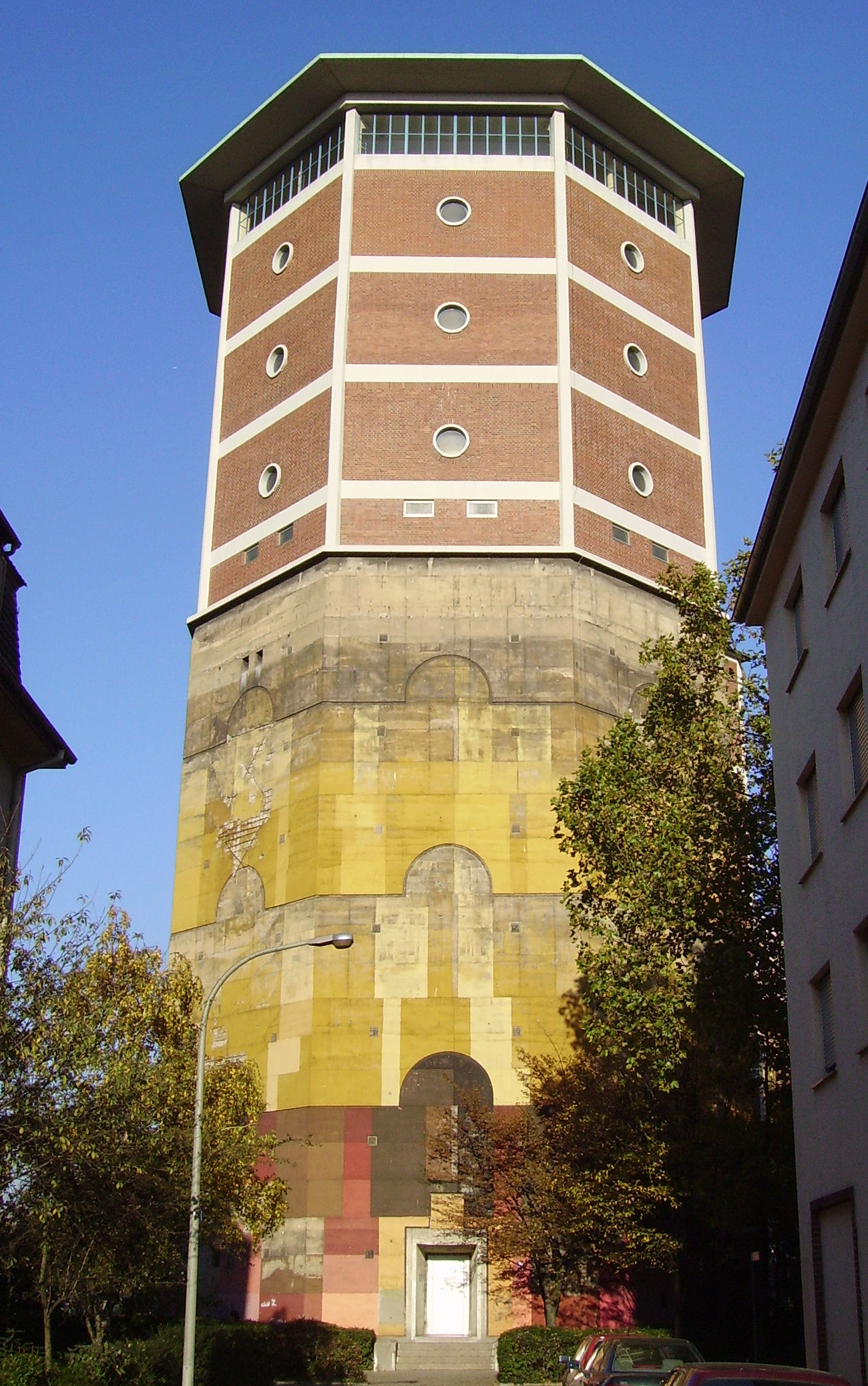
as water tower (1953)

as office building (2019)

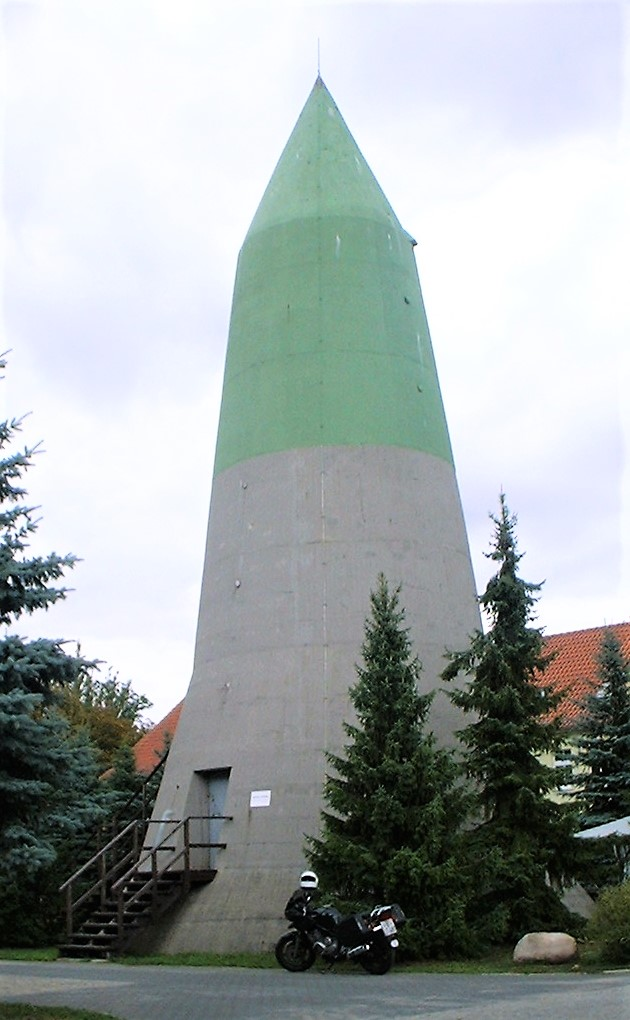
Winkelturm in Wünsdorf, Brandenburg

One particular variant of the Hochbunker was the Winkelturm, named after its designer, Leo Winkel of Duisburg. Winkel patented his design in 1934, and from 1936 onward, Germany built 98 Winkeltürme of five different types. The towers had a conical shape with walls that curved downward to a reinforced base. The dimensions of the towers varied. Diameters ranged between 8.4 and 10 metres (28 and 33 ft) and the height between 20 and 25 metres (66 and 82 ft). The walls of the towers had a minimum thickness for reinforced concrete of 0.8 metres (2 ft 7 in) and 1.5 metres (4 ft 11 in) for ordinary concrete. The towers were able to shelter between 164 and 500 people, depending on the type. The intent with the Winkeltürme and the other Hochbunker was to protect workers in rail yards and industrial areas. Because of their shape, the towers became known colloquially as "cigar stubs" or "sugar beets".

The theory behind the Winkeltürme was that the curved walls would deflect any bomb hitting the tower, directing it down towards the base. The towers had a small footprint, which was probably a greater protection. A US bomb did hit one tower in Bremen in October 1944; the bomb exploded through the roof, killing five people inside.

=== Israel ===
Miklat (Hebrew: מקלט, lit. 'protected place') Is a type of air raid shelter found in Israel inside homes, near residential areas and in other places across the country.

These places are also called Merkhav Mugan (Hebrew: מרחב מוגן, lit. 'protected space'). They are reinforced security rooms required in all new buildings by Israeli law.

==== Types ====
- Miklat Tzibury (מקלט ציבורי) – lit. 'public shelter', a partly underground facility, installed in residential areas. They are commonly used for community needs (clubs, education etc.). Maintained by the local governance and Home Front. They are located in streets and near public facilities.

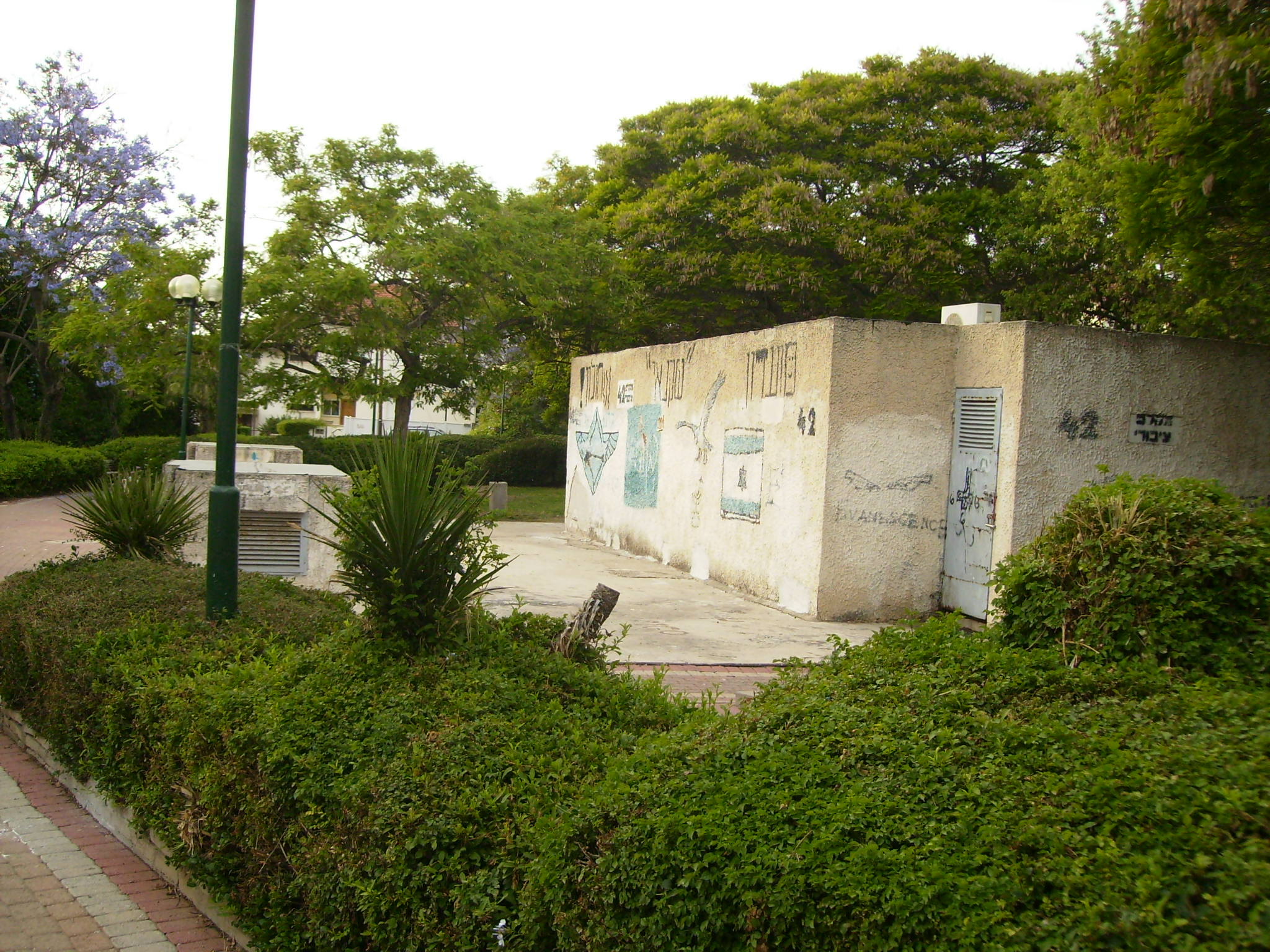
Public miklat in Holon

- Miklat BeBayit Meshutaf (מקלט בבית משותף) – lit. 'shelter' in a condominium, a facility built into a building which has been declared as a condominium (commonly in a low-rise building) it includes all the facilities that a public shelter has, but is maintained by the building residents.
- Merkhav Mugan Dirati (מרחב מוגן דירתי or ממ״ד) – installed in residential apartments and private houses.
- Merkhav Mugan Komati (מרחב מוגן קומתי or ממ״ק) – common floor space in apartment buildings in which there is no Merkhav Mugan Dirati in every apartment and in other multi-storey buildings (mostly offices and industry).
- Merkhav Mugan Mosadi (מרחב מוגן מוסדי or ממ״מ) – installed in every public structure.

=== United Kingdom ===
==== Cellars ====
Cellars in the UK, were mainly included only in larger houses, and in houses built up to the period of World War I, after which detached and semi-detached properties were constructed without cellars, usually to avoid the higher building costs entailed. Since house building had increased vastly between the wars, the lack of cellars in more recent housing became a major problem in the Air Raid Precautions (ARP) programmes in the UK during World War II.

Alternatives had to be found speedily once it became clear that Germany was contemplating air raids as a means of demoralising the population and disrupting supply lines in the UK. Initial recommendations were that householders should shelter under the stairs. Later, authorities supplied materials to households to construct communal street shelters and Morrison and Anderson shelters.

==== Basements ====
Basements also became available for the use of air raid shelters. Basements under factory premises, schools, hospitals, department stores and other businesses were utilised. However, these ad hoc shelters could bring additional dangers, as heavy machinery and materials or water storage facilities above the shelter, and insufficient support structures threatened to cause the collapse of basements.

When the Wilkinson's Lemonade factory in North Shields received a direct hit on Saturday, 3 May 1941 during a German attack on the north-east coast of England, 107 occupants lost their lives when heavy machinery fell through the ceiling of the basement in which they were sheltering.

==== Railway arches and subways (underpasses) ====
British cities prepared for use of railway arches and underpasses in 1935 and railway arches and subways were operationalised in the UK for air raid protection during World War II.

Railway arches were deep, curved structures of brick or concrete, set into the vertical sidewalls of railway lines, which had been intended originally for commercial depots, etc. The arches were covered usually with wooden or brick screen- or curtain walls, thus giving a considerable amount of protection against air raids – provided, of course, that railway lines were not the prime target of the attack at the particular time and so being more likely to suffer from direct hits. Each arch could accommodate anything from around 60 to 150 people. However, fewer people could find shelter at night as sleeping areas for the occupants took up more of the space available – a limitation applying to any other type of shelter as well. Subways were actual thoroughfares also in the shape of arches, normally allowing passage underneath railway lines.

==== London Underground stations ====
Prior to the beginning of the war, shelter policy had been determined by John Anderson, then Lord Privy Seal and, on the declaration of war, Home Secretary and Minister of Home Security. Anderson announced the policy to Parliament on 20 April 1939, based on a report from a committee chaired by Lord Hailey. This reaffirmed a policy of dispersal and eschewed the use of deep shelters, including the use of tube stations and underground tunnels as public shelters. Reasons given were the spread of disease due to the lack of toilet facilities at many stations, the inherent danger of people falling onto the lines, and that people sheltering in the stations and tunnels might be tempted to stay in them day and night because they would feel safer there than outside the stations.

None of these concerns had been borne out by experience during the bombing raids of the First World War, when eighty specially adapted tube stations had been pressed into use, but in a highly controversial decision in January 1924, Anderson, then chairman of the Air Raid Precautions Committee of Imperial Defence, had ruled out the tube station shelter option in any future conflict.

Following the intensive bombing of London on 7 September 1940 and the overnight raids of 7/8 September, there was considerable pressure to change the policy but, even following a review on 17 September, the government stood firm. On 19 September, William Mabane, parliamentary secretary to the Ministry of Home Security, urged the public not to leave their Anderson shelters for public shelters, saying it deprived others of shelter. "We're going to improve the amenities in existing shelters", he promised. "We're setting about providing better lighting and better accommodation for sleeping and better sanitary arrangements." The Ministries of Home Security and Transport jointly issued an "urgent appeal", telling the public "to refrain from using Tube stations as air-raid shelters except in the case of urgent necessity".

Over the night of 19/20 September, thousands of Londoners took matters in their own hands. They had flocked to the Tubes for shelter, at some stations, they began to arrive as early as 4:00 pm, with bedding and bags of food to sustain them for the night. By the time the evening rush hour was in progress, they had already staked their "pitches" on the platforms. The police did not intervene and some station managers, on their own initiative, provided additional toilet facilities. Transport Minister John Reith, and the chairman of London Transport, Lord Ashfield, inspected Holborn tube station to see for themselves.

The government realised that it could not contain this popular revolt. On 21 September, it abruptly changed policy, removing its objections to the use of tube stations. In what it called part of its "deep shelter extension policy", it decided to close the short section of Piccadilly line from Holborn to Aldwych, and convert different sections for specific wartime use, including a public air raid shelter at Aldwych. Floodgates were installed at various points to protect the network should bombs breach the tunnels under the Thames, or large water mains in the vicinity of stations. Seventy-nine stations were fitted with bunks for 22,000 people, supplied with first aid facilities and equipped with chemical toilets. 124 canteens opened in all parts of the tube system. Shelter marshals were appointed, whose function it was to keep order, give first aid and assist in case of the flooding of the tunnels.

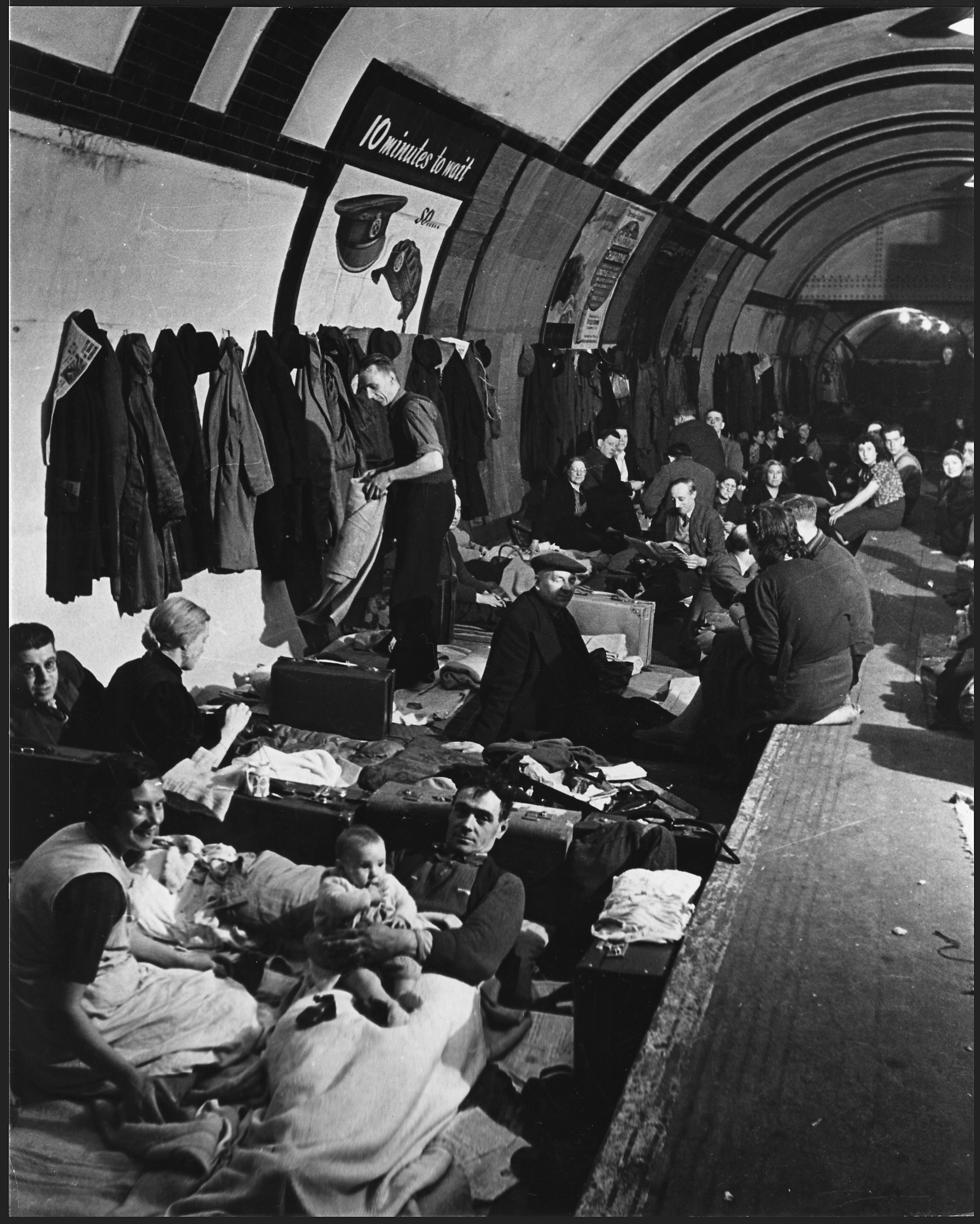
London Underground station in use as an air-raid shelter during World War II

Businesses (for example Plessey Ltd) were allowed to use the Underground stations and unopened tunnels; government offices were installed in others and the anti-aircraft centre for London used a station as its headquarters. Tube stations and tunnels were still vulnerable to a direct hit and on 14 October 1940, a bomb penetrated the road and tunnel at Balham tube station, blew up the water mains and sewage pipes, and killed 66 people. At Bank station, a direct hit caused a crater of 37 by 30 metres (120 ft × 100 ft) on 11 January 1941; the road above the station collapsed and killed 56 occupants. The highest death toll was caused by an incident at the unfinished Bethnal Green tube station on 8 March 1943, when 1,500 people entered the station. The crowd suddenly surged forward upon hearing the unfamiliar sound of a new type of anti-aircraft rocket being launched nearby. Someone stumbled on the stairs, and the crowd pushing on, were falling on top of one another, and 173 people were crushed to death in the disaster.

The London Underground system was considered one of the safest means of protecting relatively many people in a high-density area of the capital. An estimated 170,000 people sheltered in the tunnels and stations during the war. Although not a great number in comparison to the population of the capital, it almost certainly saved the lives of the people who probably would have had to find alternative, less secure means of protection. Artists and photographers such as Henry Moore and Bill Brandt were employed as war artists to document life in London's shelters during the war.

==== Other tunnels ====
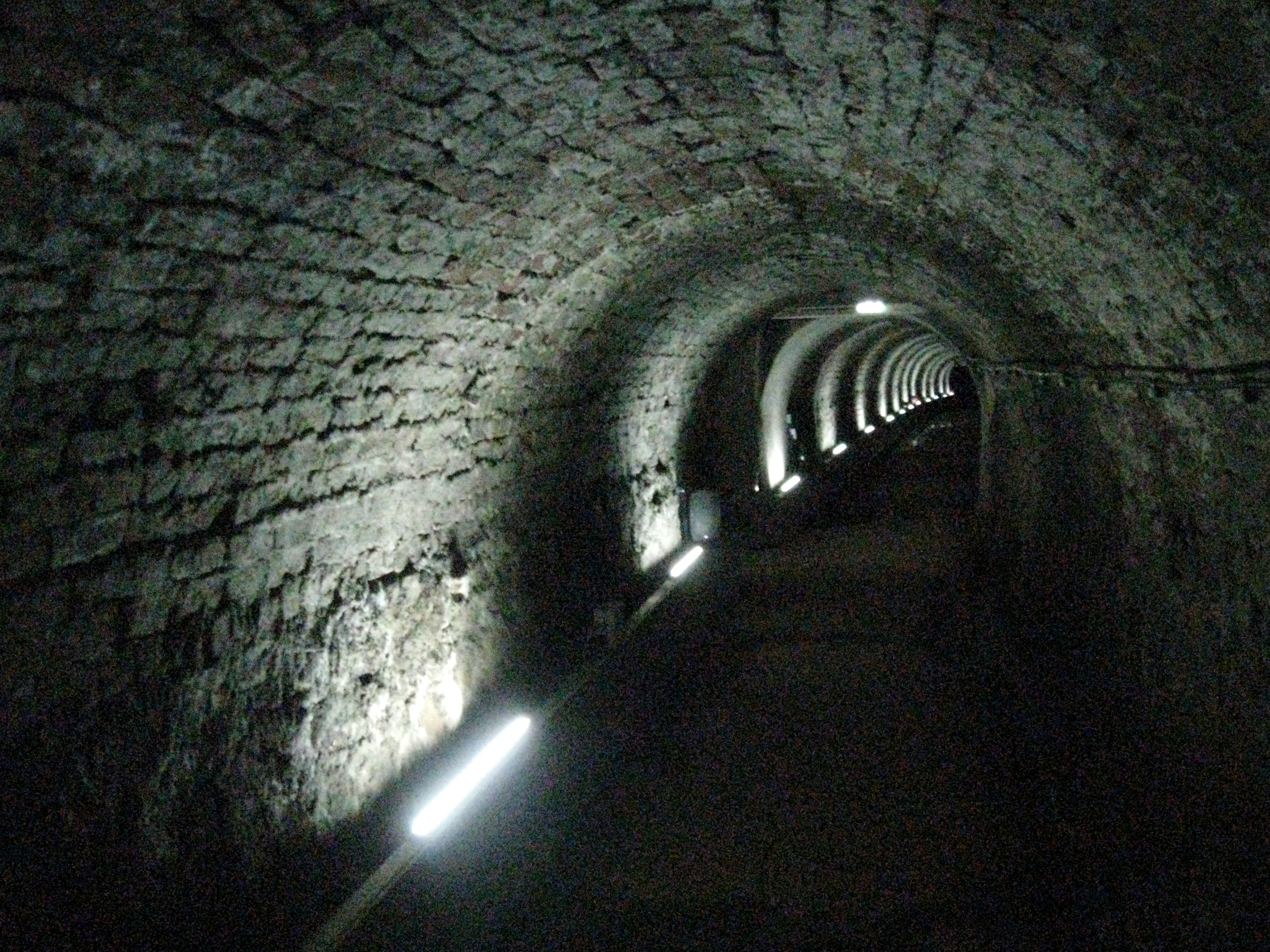
The Victoria Tunnel offered air raid shelter.

External videos
- By 1935... the government stated, every city should have air raid protection.

Many other types of tunnels were adapted for shelters to protect the civil population, and the military and administrative establishment in the UK during the war. Some had been built many years before, some had been part of an ancient defence system, and some had belonged to commercial enterprises, such as coal mining.

The Victoria Tunnel at Newcastle upon Tyne, for example, completed in 1842 and used for transporting coal from Leazes Main Colliery to the River Tyne, had been closed in 1860 and remained so until 1939. In places the tunnel was 12 metres (39 ft) deep. Stretching in parts beneath the city of Newcastle, it was converted to air raid shelters with a capacity for 9,000 people.

Tunnels linked to landing stages built on the River Irwell in Manchester at the end of the nineteenth century were also used as air-raid shelters.

The medieval labyrinth of tunnels beneath Dover Castle had been built originally as part of the defensive system of the approaches to England, extended over the centuries and further excavated and reinforced during the world wars, until it was capable of accommodating large parts of the secret defence systems protecting the British Isles. On 26 May 1940, it became the headquarters under Vice Admiral Bertram Ramsay of Operation Dynamo, from which the rescue and evacuation of up to 338,000 troops from France was directed.

In Stockport, 6 mi (9.7 km) south of Manchester, four sets of underground air raid shelter tunnels for civilian use were dug into the red sandstone on which the town centre stands. Preparation started in September 1938 and the first set of shelters was opened on 28 October 1939. (Stockport was not bombed until 11 October 1940.) The smallest of the tunnel shelters could accommodate 2,000 people and the largest 3,850 (subsequently expanded to take up to 6,500 people.) The largest of the Stockport Air Raid Shelters are open to the public as part of the town's museum service.

In southeast London, residents made use of the Chislehurst Caves beneath Chislehurst, a 35-kilometre-long (22 mi) network of caves which have existed since the Middle Ages for the mining of chalk and flint.

==== Street communal shelter ====
In the United Kingdom, public shelters in open spaces, especially near streets, were needed for pedestrians, drivers and passengers in passing vehicles, etc. The programme of building street communal shelters commenced in March 1940, the government supplying the materials, and being the moving force behind the scheme, and private builders executing the work under the supervision of surveyors. These shelters consisted of 360-millimetre (14 in) brick walls and 300-millimetre-thick (1 ft) reinforced concrete roofs, similarly to, but much larger than, the private shelters in backyards and gardens being introduced slightly later. The communal shelters were usually intended to accommodate about fifty persons, and were divided into various sections by interior walls with openings connecting the different sections. Sections were normally furnished with six bunks.

The construction work then went on rapidly, until the resources of concrete and bricks began to be depleted due to the excessive demand placed on them so suddenly. Also, the performance of the early street shelters was a serious blow to public confidence. Their walls were shaken down either by earth shock or blast, and the concrete roofs then fell onto the helpless occupants, and this was there for all to see. At around the same time rumours of accidents started to circulate, such as on one occasion people being drowned due to a burst main filling up the shelter with water. Although much improved designs were being introduced whose performance had been demonstrated in explosion trials, communal shelters became highly unpopular, and shortly afterwards householders were being encouraged to build or have built private shelters on their properties, or within their houses, with materials being supplied by the government.

==== Anderson shelter ====
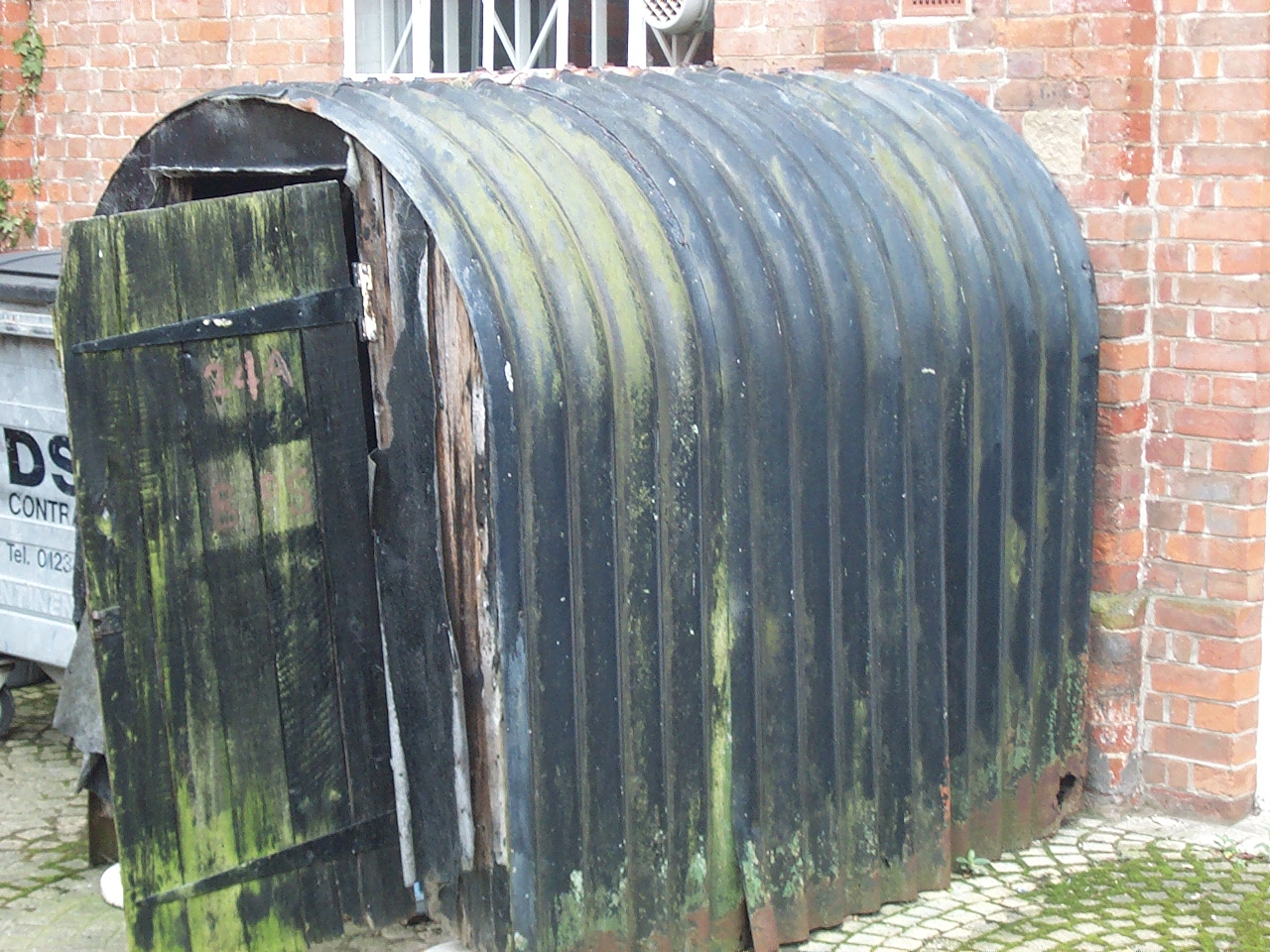
An unburied Anderson shelter in 2007, showing the distinctive curved shape of its walls; this shelter had seen use after the war as a shed

The Anderson shelter was designed in 1938 by William Paterson and Oscar Carl (Karl) Kerrison in response to a request from the Home Office. It was named after Sir John Anderson, then Lord Privy Seal with special responsibility for preparing air-raid precautions immediately prior to the outbreak of World War II, and it was he who then initiated the development of the shelter. After evaluation by David Anderson, Bertram Lawrence Hurst, and Sir Henry Jupp, of the Institution of Civil Engineers, the design was released for production.

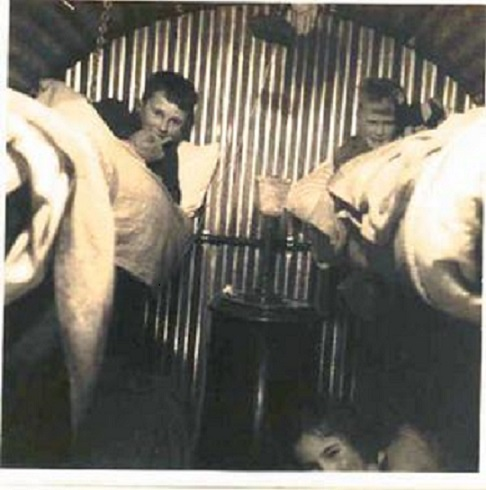
Children preparing to sleep in the Anderson shelter installed in their garden during frequent bombing raids on Bournemouth in 1941

Anderson shelters were designed to accommodate up to six people. The main principle of protection was based on curved and straight galvanised corrugated steel panels. Six curved panels were bolted together at the top, so forming the main body of the shelter, three straight sheets on either side, and two more straight panels were fixed to each end, one containing the door—a total of fourteen panels. A small drainage sump was often incorporated in the floor to collect rainwater seeping into the shelter.

The shelters were 1.8 metres (6 ft) high, 1.4 metres (4.5 ft) wide, and 2.0 metres (6.5 ft) long. When installed underground, they were buried 1.2 metres (4 ft) deep in the soil and then covered with a minimum of 38 centimetres (15 in) of soil above the roof. When they were buried outside, the earth banks could be planted with vegetables and flowers, that at times could be quite an appealing sight and in this way would become the subject of competitions of the best-planted shelter among householders in the neighbourhood. The internal fitting out of the shelter was left to the owner and so there were wide variations in comfort.

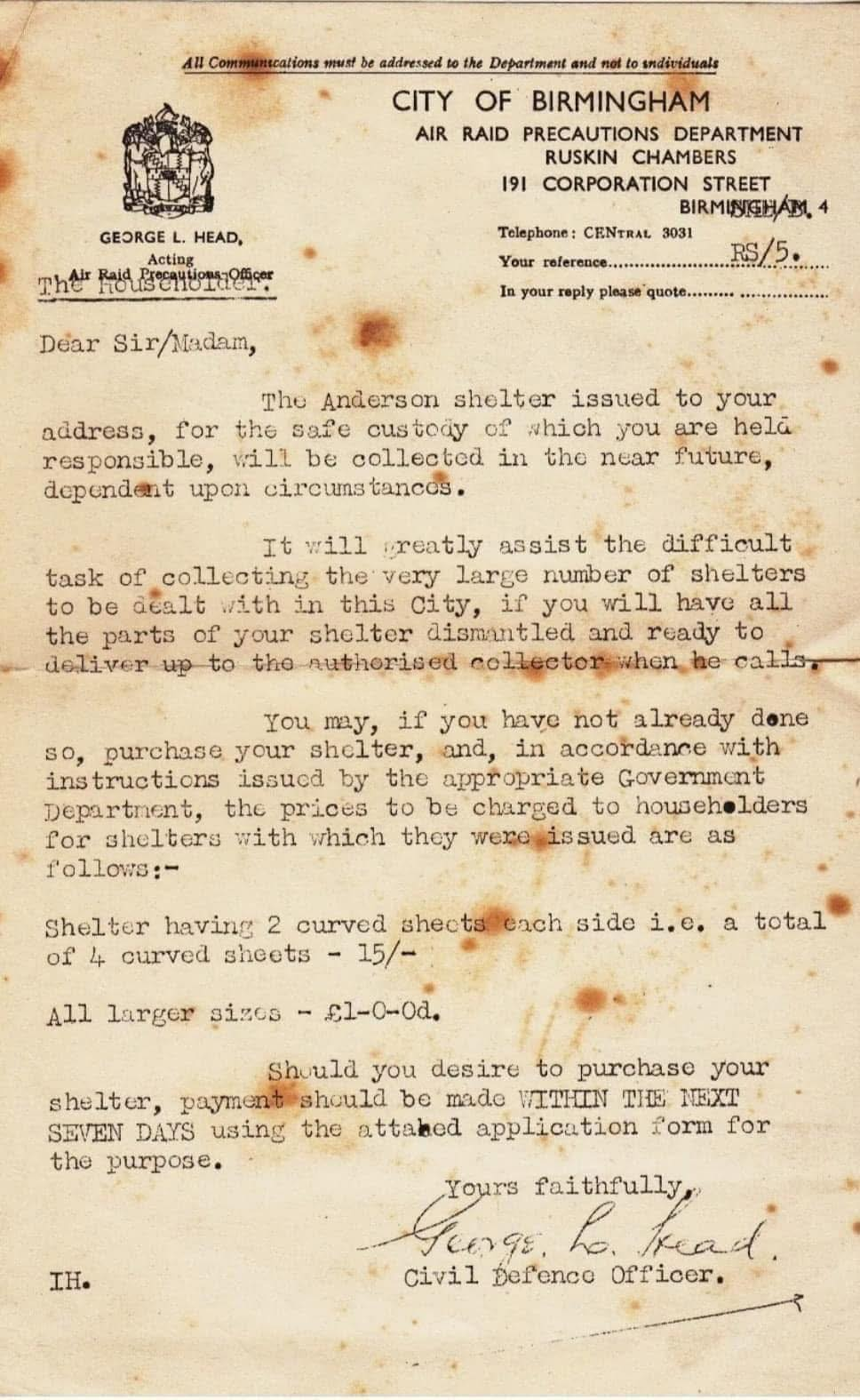
Letter issued to Birmingham householders, notifying them of collection arrangements for Anderson shelters, with prices for purchase

Anderson shelters were issued free to all householders who earned less than £5 a week (equivalent to £280 in 2025, when adjusted for inflation). Those with a higher income were charged £7 (£400 in 2025) for their shelter. One and a half million shelters of this type were distributed between February 1939 and the outbreak of war. During the war a further 2.1 million were erected. Large numbers were manufactured at John Summers & Sons ironworks at Shotton on Deeside with production peaking at 50,000 units per week.

The Anderson shelters performed well under blast and ground shock, because they had good connectivity and ductility, which meant that they could absorb a great deal of energy through plastic deformation without falling apart. (This was in marked contrast to other trench shelters which used concrete for the sides and roof, which were inherently unstable when disturbed by the effects of an explosion – if the roof slab lifted, the walls fell in under the static earth pressure; if the walls were pushed in, the roof would be unsupported at one edge and would fall.) However, when the pattern of all-night alerts became established, it was realised that in winter Anderson shelters installed outside were cold damp holes in the ground and often flooded in wet weather, and so their occupancy factor would be poor. This led to the development of the indoor Morrison shelter.

At the end of the war in Europe, households who had received an Anderson shelter were expected to remove their shelters and local authorities began the task of reclaiming the corrugated iron. Householders who wished to keep their Anderson shelter (or more likely the valuable metal) could pay a nominal fee.

Because of the large number made and their robustness, many Anderson shelters still survive. Many were dug up after the war and converted into storage sheds for use in gardens and allotments.

==== Morrison shelter ====
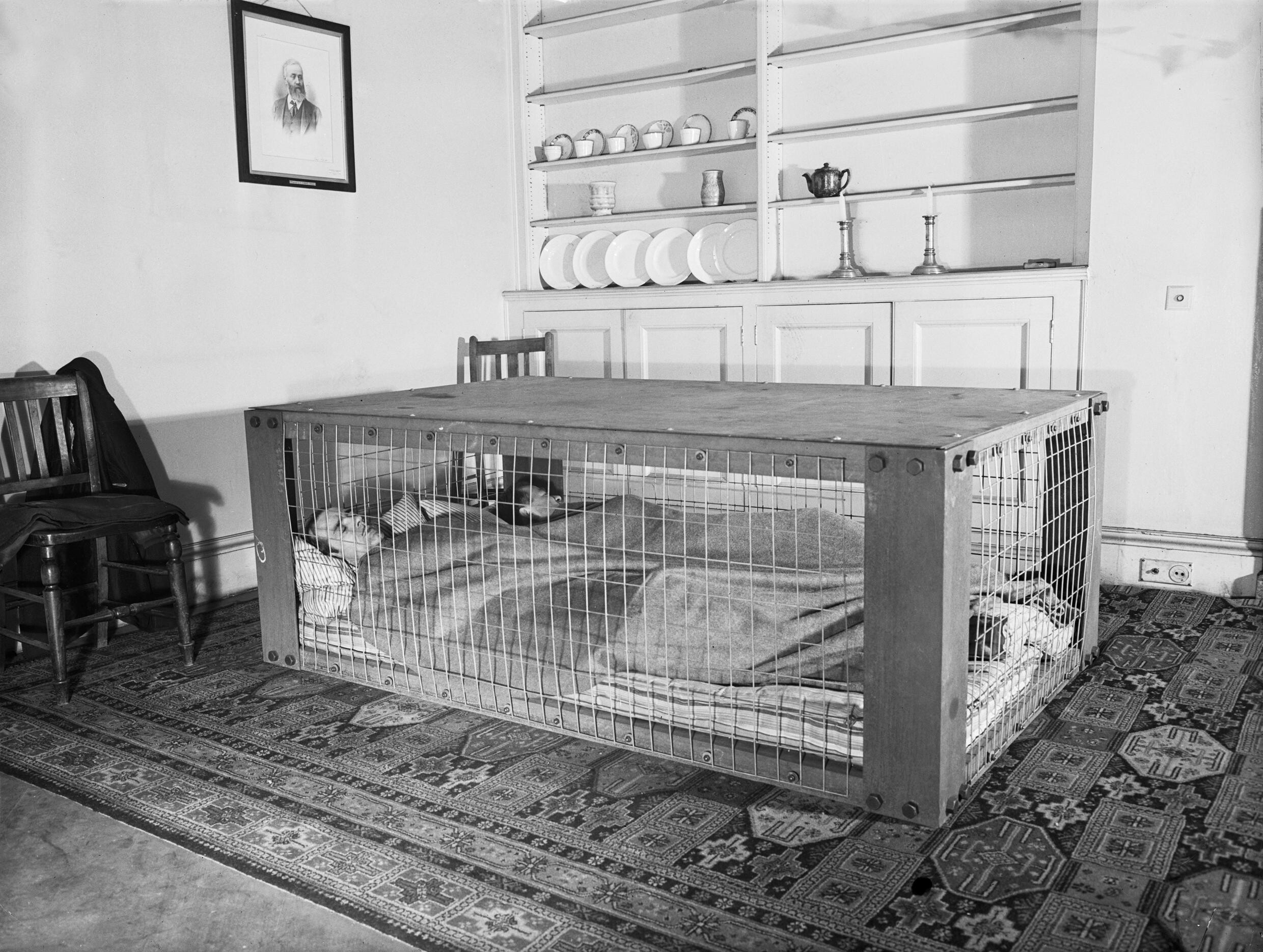
A couple demonstrating the use of a Morrison shelter

The Morrison shelter, officially termed Table (Morrison) Indoor Shelter, had a cage-like construction beneath it. It was designed by John Baker and named after Herbert Morrison, the Minister of Home Security at the time. It was the result of the realisation that due to the lack of house cellars it was necessary to develop an effective type of indoor shelter. The shelters came in assembly kits, to be bolted together inside the home. They were approximately 1.98 metres (6 ft 6 in) long, 1.2 metres (4 ft) wide and 0.76 metres (2 ft 6 in) high, had a solid 3.2 millimetres (1/8 in) steel plate "table" top, welded wire mesh sides, and a metal lath "mattress"-type floor. Altogether it had 359 parts and had three tools supplied with the pack.

The shelter was provided free to households whose combined income was less than £400 per year (equivalent to £23,000 in 2025).

Head of the Engineering Department at Cambridge University, Professor John Baker (later Lord Baker) presented an undergraduate lecture on the principles of design of the shelter as an introduction to his theory of plastic design of structures, which can be summarised as follows:

It was impractical to produce a design for mass production that could withstand a direct hit, and so it was a matter of selecting a suitable design target that would save lives in many cases of blast damage to bombed houses. Examination of bombed buildings indicated that in many instances, one end wall of a house was sucked or blown out by a nearby blast, and the floor of the first storey pivoted about its other end (supported by a largely intact wall) and killed the inhabitants. The Morrison shelter was therefore designed to be able to withstand the upper floor falling, of a typical two storey-house undergoing a partial collapse. The shelter was designed to absorb this energy by plastic deformation, since this can absorb two or three orders of magnitude more energy than elastic deformation. Its design enabled the family to sleep under the shelter at night or during raids, and to use it as a dining table in the daytime, making it a practical item in the house.

Half a million Morrison shelters had been distributed by the end of 1941, with a further 100,000 being added in 1943 to prepare the population for the expected German V-1 flying bomb (doodlebug) attacks.

In one examination of 44 severely damaged houses it was found that 3 people had been killed, 13 seriously injured, and 16 slightly injured out of a total of 136 people who had occupied Morrison shelters; thus 120 out of 136 escaped from severely bomb-damaged houses without serious injury. Furthermore, it was discovered that the fatalities had occurred in a house which had suffered a direct hit, and some of the severely injured were in shelters sited incorrectly within the houses.

In July 1950, the Royal Commission on Awards to Inventors made an award of £3,000 (£89,000) to Baker for his design of the Morrison shelter.

In 1981, the British government would issue a series of Domestic Nuclear Shelters publications to complement the earlier Protect and Survive pamphlet. One of the shelters depicted in Domestic Nuclear Shelters, the Type 2 indoor shelter, was mostly identical to the Morrison shelter, and the assembly instructions were essentially the same as those contained in the 1941 How to Put Up Your Morrison 'Table' Shelter pamphlet.

==== Scallywag bunkers ====
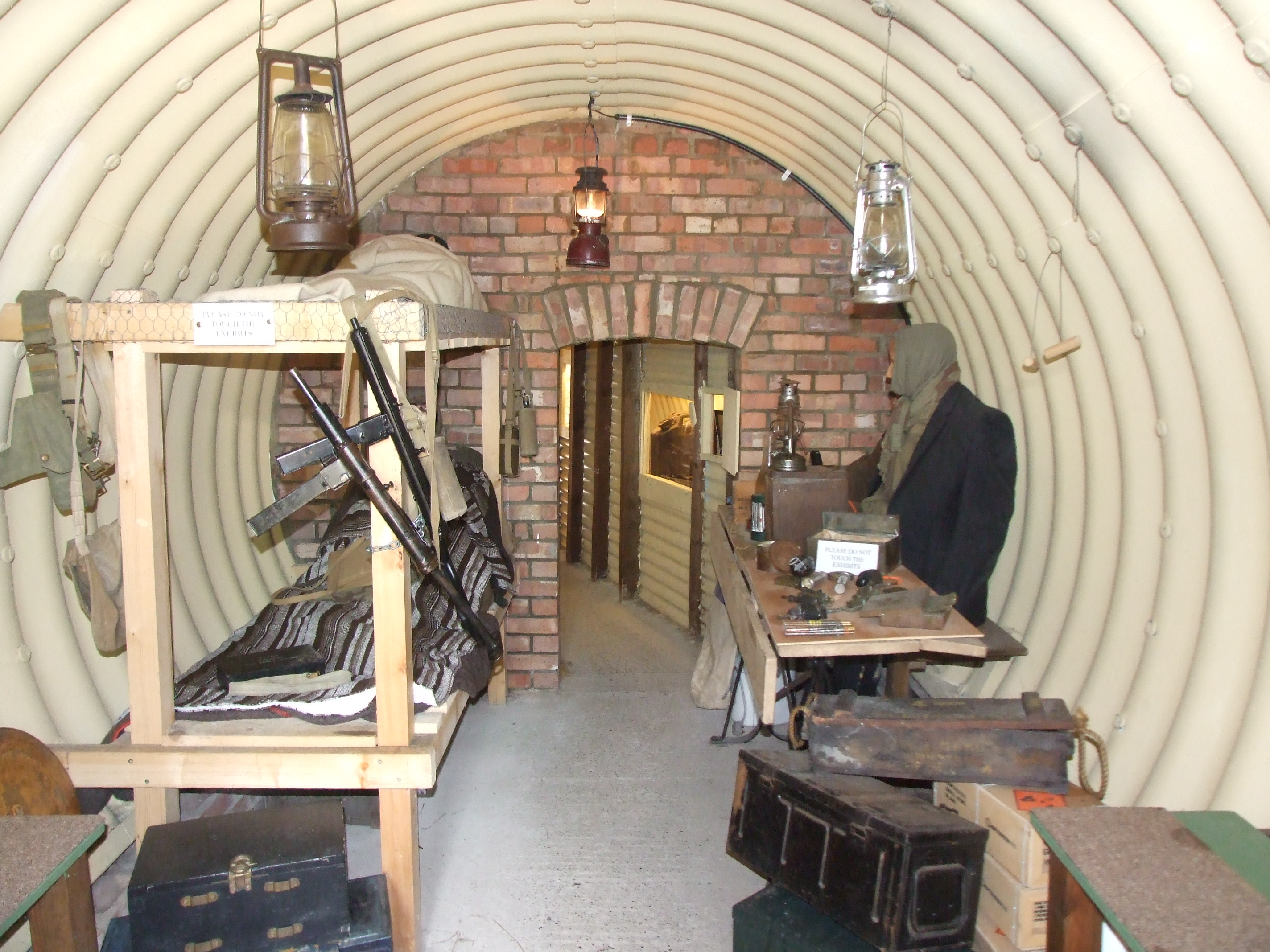
Reconstruction of a Scallywag bunker at Parham Airfield Museum, Suffolk

Scallywag bunkers or Operational Base (OB) were underground bunkers used by Auxiliary Units of the British Resistance against Axis powers invasion of the United Kingdom. They were provided with elaborately concealed underground Operational Bases, usually built by the Royal Engineers in a local woodland, with a camouflaged entrance and emergency escape tunnel.

==== Stanton shelters ====
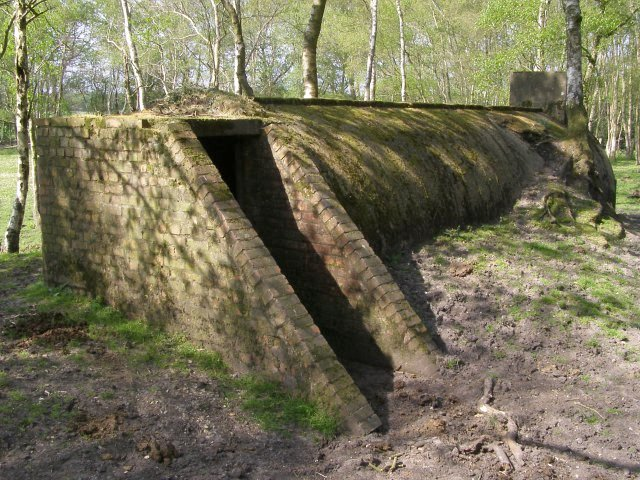
An abandoned Stanton shelter at the disused airfield RAF Beaulieu (2007)

A segment shelter manufactured by the Stanton Ironworks, Ilkeston, Derbyshire. The shop producing spun-concrete lighting columns ceased production and turned over to concrete air-raid shelters, of which 100,000 tonnes (220 million pounds) were manufactured, principally for the air ministry. Reinforced concrete proved an ideal material for air-raid shelters, being strong and resistant to shock with no deterioration with the passing of time. This type of segment shelter was of simple design and of low cost—any length of shelter could be built up from the pre-cast steel reinforced concrete segments.

The segments were 510 millimetres (20 in) wide; a pair of them formed an arch 2.1 metres (7 ft) high and transverse struts were provided to ensure rigidity. These fitted into longitudinal bearers which were grooved to receive the foot of each segment. Each pair of segments was bolted together at the apex of the arch and each segment was also bolted to its neighbour, the joints being sealed with a bituminous compound. The convenient handling of these segments enabled them to be transported onto sites where close access by motor lorry was not possible. Partly buried in the ground, with a suitably screened entrance, this bolted shelter afforded safe protection against blast and splinters.

=== Other construction ===
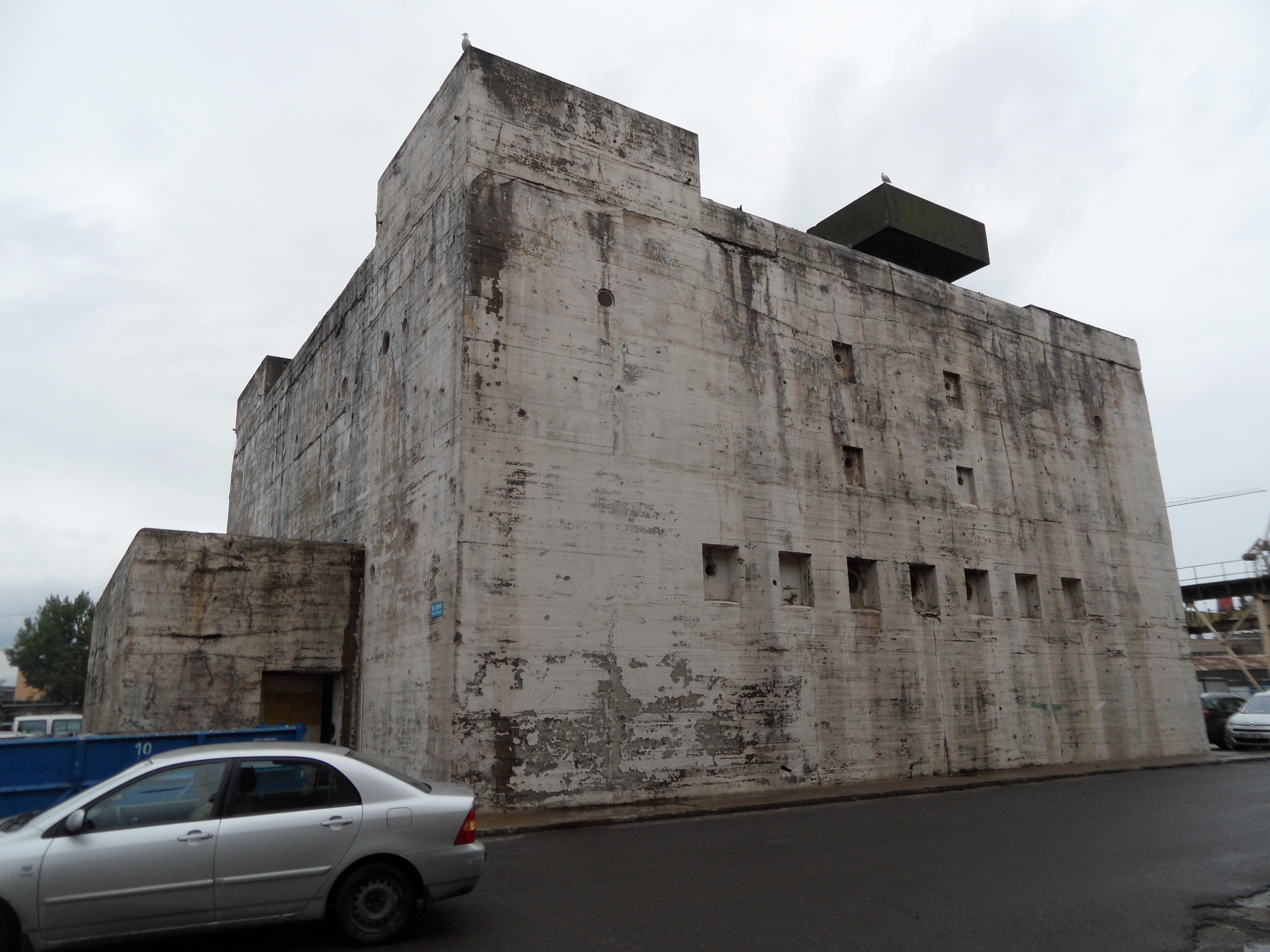
German anti-aircraft shelter from the Second World War at the shipyard in Gdańsk was built without a basement due to the presence of groundwater

Some air-raid shelters were constructed in residential building schemes in anticipation of the Second World War. There is a surviving example at St Leonard's Court in East Sheen, southwest London.

Military air-raid shelters included blast pens at airfields for the security of aircrews and aircraft maintenance personnel away from the main airbase buildings.

Few shelters could survive a direct bomb-hit. The German authorities claimed that Hochbunker were totally bomb-proof, but none were targeted by any of the 41 10,000-kilogram (22,000 lb) Grand Slam earthquake bombs dropped by the RAF by the end of World War II. Two of these bombs were dropped on the U-Bootbunkerwerft Valentin submarine pens near Bremen and these barely penetrated 4 to 7 metres (13 to 23 ft) of reinforced concrete, bringing down the roof.

More recently, the penetration by laser-guided "smart bombs" of the Amiriyah shelter during the 1991 Gulf War showed how vulnerable even reinforced concrete shelters are to direct hits from bunker-buster bombs. However, the air-raid shelters are built to protect the civilian population, so protection against a direct hit is of secondary value. The most important dangers are the blast and shrapnel.

== Air-raid shelters in modern times ==
Old air-raid shelters, such as the Anderson, can still be found in back gardens, in which they are commonly used as sheds, or (on a roof covered with earth) as vegetable patches.

Countries which have kept air-raid shelters intact and in ready condition include Switzerland, Spain and Finland.

=== Switzerland ===
Many Swiss houses and apartment blocks still have structurally reinforced, underground basements, often featuring a concrete door around 40 cm (16 in) thick. In more modern, post-war times, these shelters are often used as storage, with the footprint of the reinforced basement divided up into individual storage units according to the number of apartments in the house. The basement shelters are built to more stringent building codes, as the ceiling especially should protect shelter-seeking people from the house collapsing. Although most Swiss houses provide their own shelters, those that do not are required by law to post directions to the nearest shelter.

=== Spain ===
Barcelona was severely bombed by Italian and German Air Forces during Spanish Civil War, particularly in 1937 and 1938. Tunnels were used as shelters at the same time that the population undertook the building of bomb shelters under the coordination of a committee for civil defense (Catalan: Junta de defensa passiva) providing planning and technical assistance. Hundreds of bomb shelters were built. Most of them are recorded, but only a few are well preserved. Among these stand out the Plaça del Diamant refuge as well as air-shelter 307 (Refugi 307), today one of the Barcelona City History Museum heritage sites.

Other cities with extant bomb shelters from the Spanish Civil War include Madrid, Guadalajara, Alcalá de Henares, Santander, Jaén, Alcañiz, Alcoy, Alicante, Almería, Valencia and Cartagena. During the war, Cartagena, an important naval base, was one of the main targets for Franco's bombers. Cartagena suffered between 40 and 117 bombings (sources are mixed about the number of attacks). The most dramatic was one carried out by the German Condor Legion on 25 November 1936. The largest air raid shelter in Cartagena, which could accommodate up to 5,500 people, has been a museum since 2004.

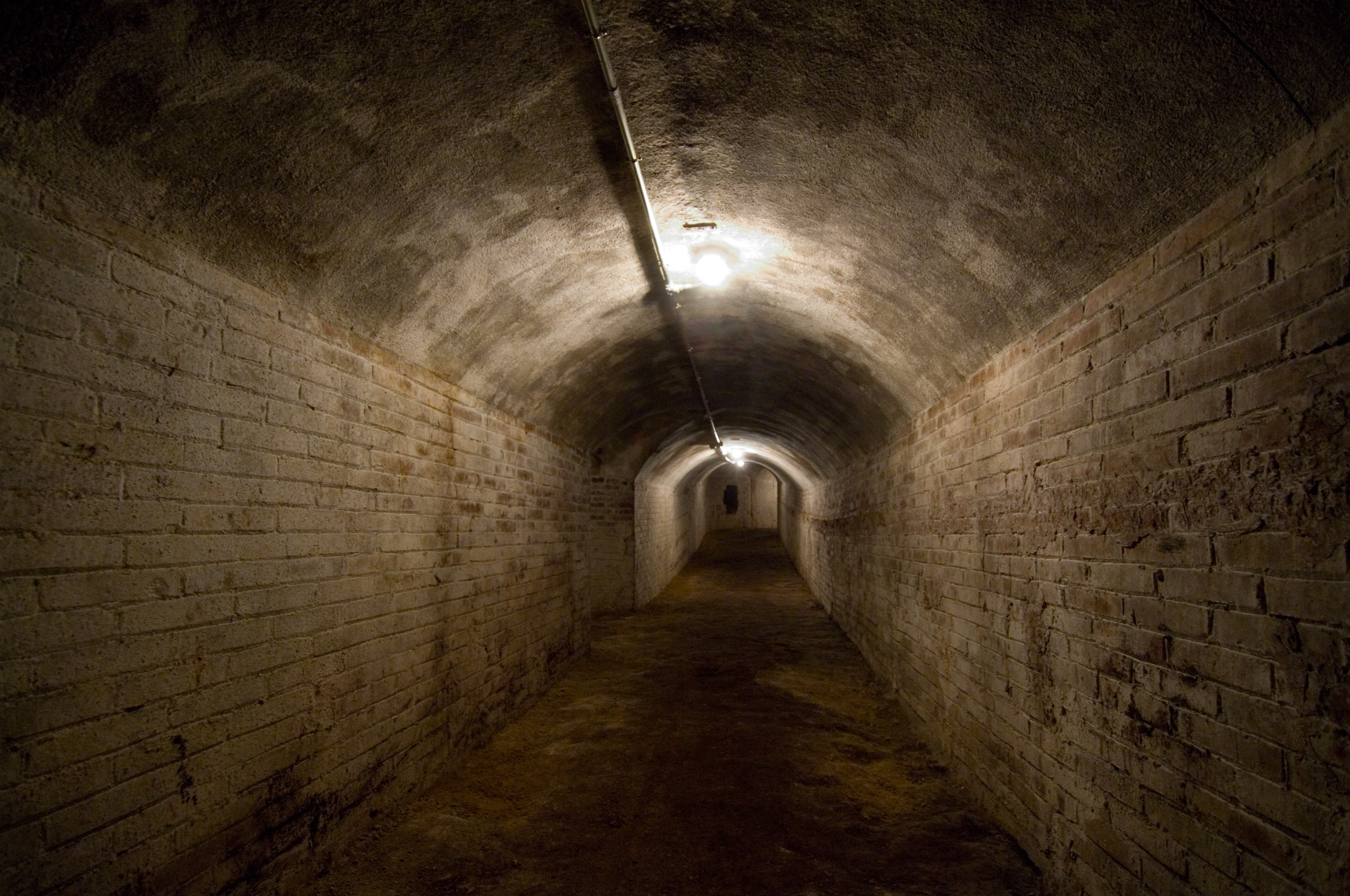
Air-raid Shelter 307 (Refugi 307) in Barcelona, was built during Spanish Civil War

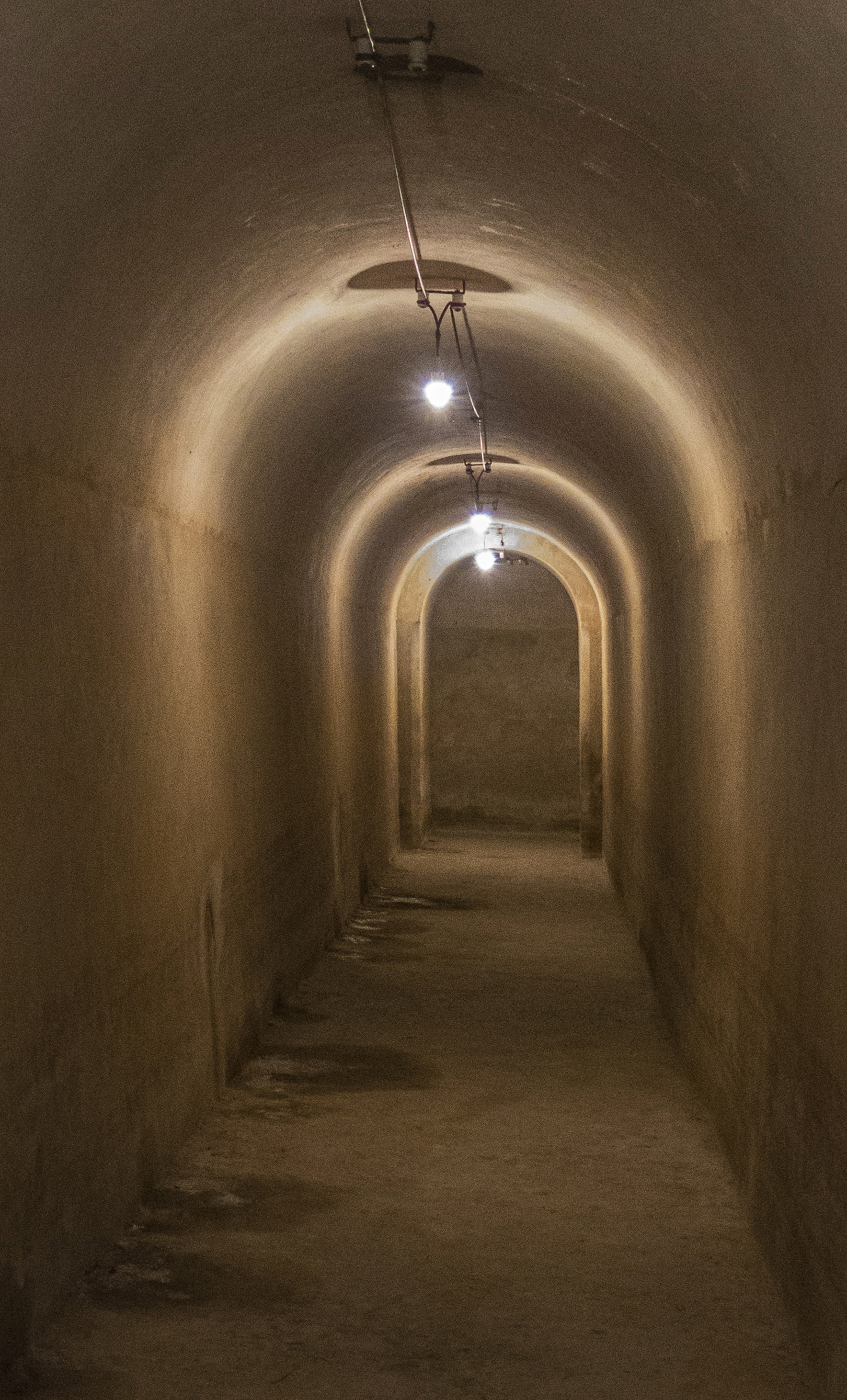
Air raid shelter in Carcaixent (Valencian Community) built by republicans during the Spanish Civil War

=== Israel ===
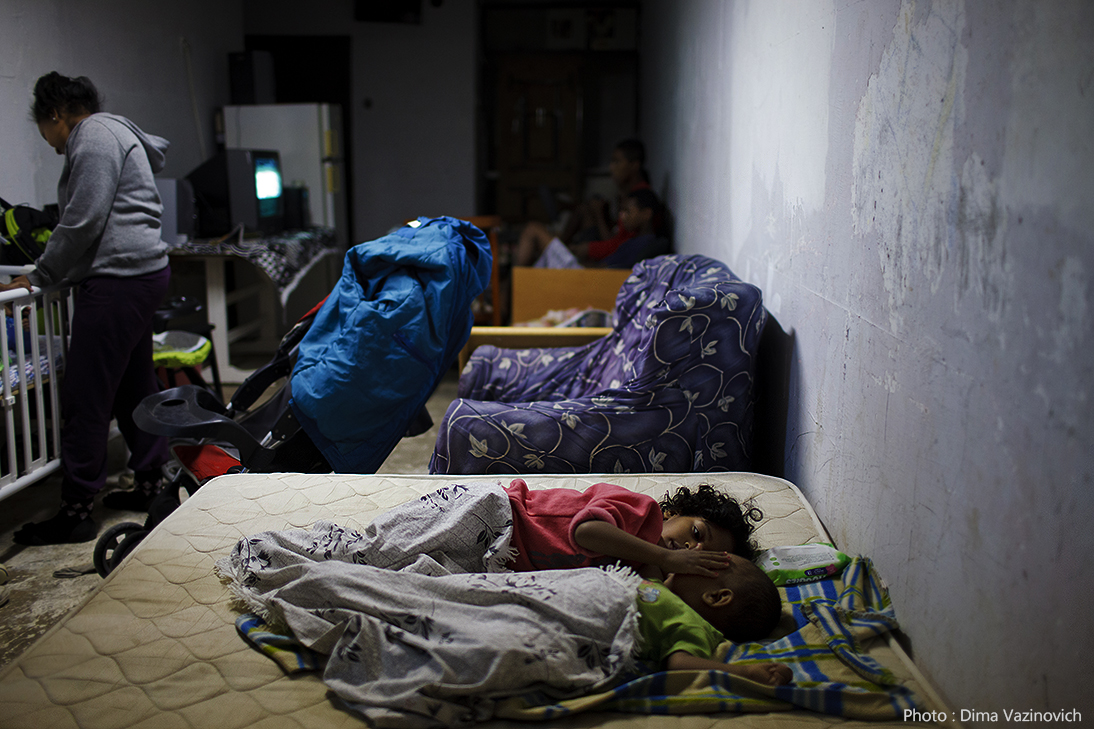
The inside of an Israeli bomb shelter in 2012

The State of Israel required all buildings to have access to air-raid shelters from 1951, and all new flats possess access to Merkhav Mugan (in-building protected spaces). All medical and educational facilities are prepared for chemical, biological, radiological and nuclear (CRBN) attacks as of 2010 – for example, each surgery room is built to withstand a direct missile hit – some are built with closed-cycle air systems and are capable of being resistant to chemical agents for short periods of time; in addition all must include chemical air filtering systems. The public air-raid shelters are commonly employed as game rooms in peacetime so that the children will be comfortable to enter them at a time of need, and will not be frightened.

=== Finland ===
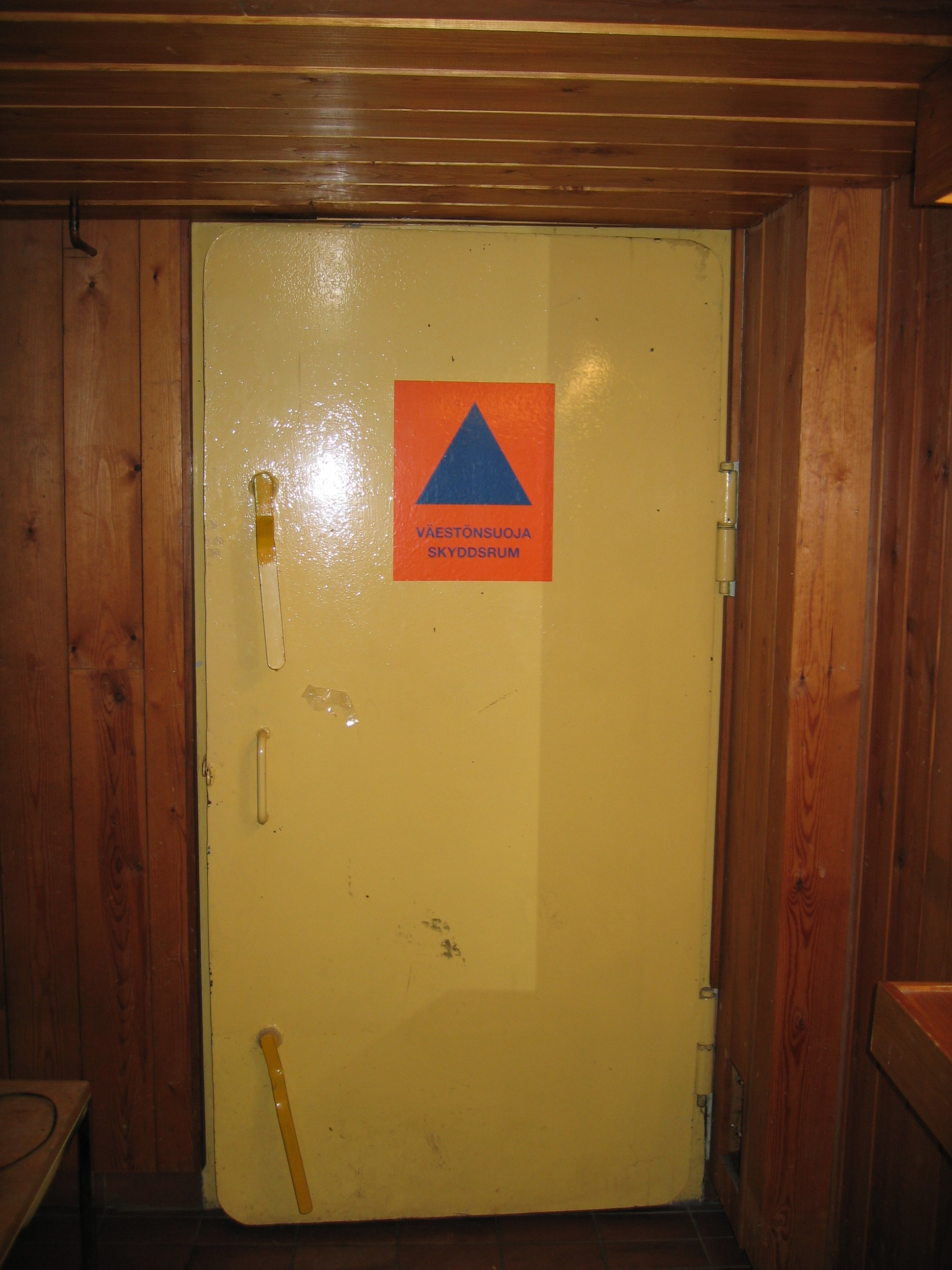
A normal Finnish S1-shelter steel door; 'S' is short for suoja (protection, shelter)

The Ministry of Interior, responsible for civil defence in Finland, maintains hard shelters, capable of accommodating 3.6 million persons, in cities and in other densely populated areas where two-thirds of the country's population live. They are built to withstand the detonation of a 100-kilotonne-of-TNT (420 TJ) nuclear bomb at ground zero. In total Finland has over 45,000 civil defence shelters which can house 3.6 million people (65% of the population). A shelter is designed to protect the population in the event of a threat of a possible gas or poison leak, armed attack such as war, radioactive fallout, or the like. Private homes rarely have them, but houses over 1,200 square metres (13,000 sq ft) are obliged to build them. Fire inspectors check the shelters every ten years and flaws have to be repaired or corrected as soon as possible. Shelters are often used as storage spaces but the law requires that inhabitants of apartment blocks must be able to clear the shelters and put them into action in less than 72 hours. Half of the air-raid shelter has to be ready to use in two hours. The types of shelters are:

- K, a small shelter for a small apartment house.
- S1, a usual shelter for apartment house.
- S3, lightweight shelter in solid rock or heavyweight shelter of ferroconcrete.
- S6, large shelters in solid rock that must be able to withstand a 6-bar (600 kPa) pressure wave.

All shelters must have:

- an electric and hand-operated air-conditioning system, which can protect from biological and chemical weapons and radioactive particles.
- a radiometer
- dry toilets
- a fixed-line telephone interface
- a spare exit
- water tanks
- a first aid kit

=== Singapore ===
Since 1998, Singapore has required all new houses and flats to have a shelter built to certain specifications. The Singapore Civil Defence Force rationalizes building such shelters in high-rise buildings by noting that weapon effects tend to be localized, and are unlikely to cause an entire building to collapse.

=== Taiwan ===
There are currently 117,669 air raid shelters in Taiwan. The first air raid shelters were constructed in the Japanese colonial period and construction expanded during WWII as allied bombers began hitting Taiwan.

=== Greece ===
During the pre-WW2 period the Metaxas regime initiated an extensive Civil Defence system designed to protect civilians in the event of enemy bombing. The system included extensive training of civilians as well as the construction of more than 12,000 air raid shelters in Attica, equipped with German made blast doors and air filtering systems. From 1939 forward virtually all new apartment buildings contained built-in hardened basements and cellars that functioned as (unofficial) bunkers, although these lacked the more sophisticated equipment of the state built shelters.

After the war, most of these shelters were either abandoned or demolished along with the apartment buildings they were built in. Public shelters were covered to make way for the modern street network. The last public inspection of the remaining shelters was performed in the 70s. Nowadays very few state built shelters remain intact, although hardened cellars still remain in the basements of most buildings in the older districts of Thessaloniki and Athens.

Notable surviving shelters include the Likavitos shelter, built inside the mountain of the same name, the Ministry of Finance bunker and the Piraeus bunkers in Athens, and the nuclear bunker under the Military Hospital no 414 in Thessaloniki.

=== Ukraine ===
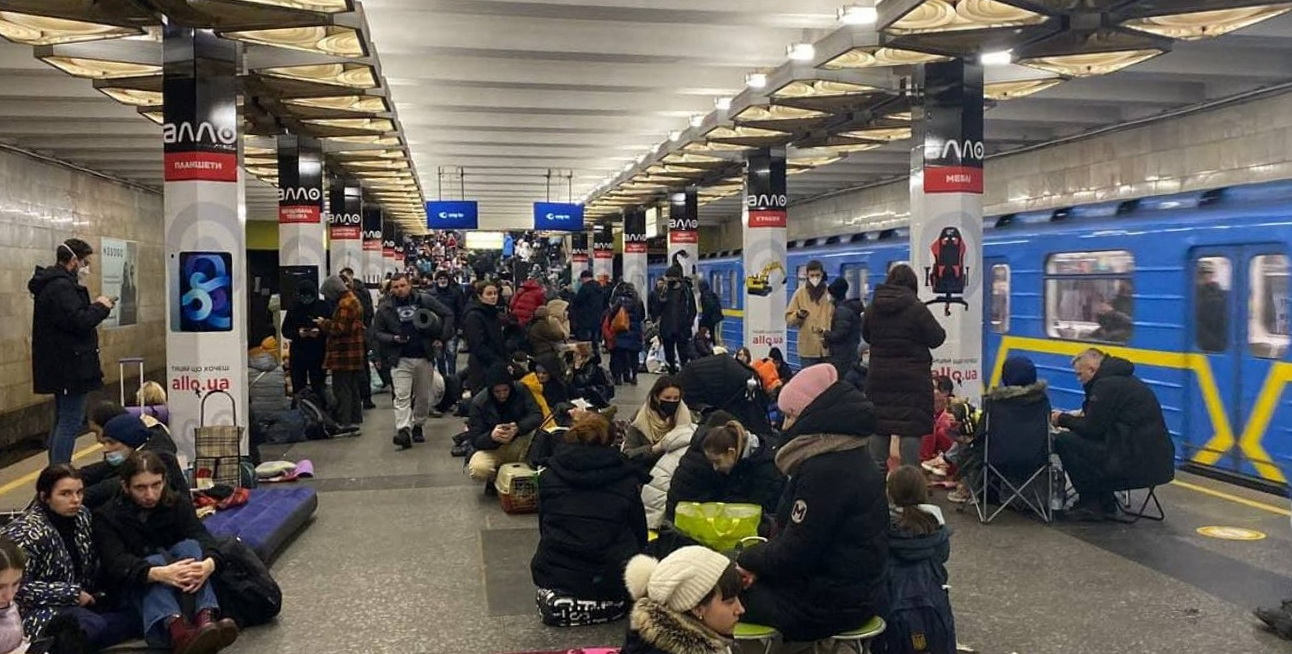
Residents sheltering in a Kyiv Metro station during the 2022 Russian invasion of Ukraine.

The Kyiv Metro was built in the wake of World War II. During the 2022 Russian invasion of Ukraine, the metro stations doubled as bomb shelters, as residents took shelter from Russian bombs. Like other former Soviet metro systems, the Kyiv metro was designed with this purpose in mind, and 47 of the city's 52 stations were designated for this purpose. During the invasion, on 24 February 2022, regular service on the metro was suspended. A reduced schedule was adopted with limited services running between 8 am and 7 pm. All underground stations remain open 24 hours a day to provide shelter. According to Kyiv's mayor Vitali Klitschko, on 2 March 2022, as many as 150,000 residents of Kyiv sought shelter in the Metro. Stations in the Kharkiv Metro were also used as shelters.

== Gallery ==
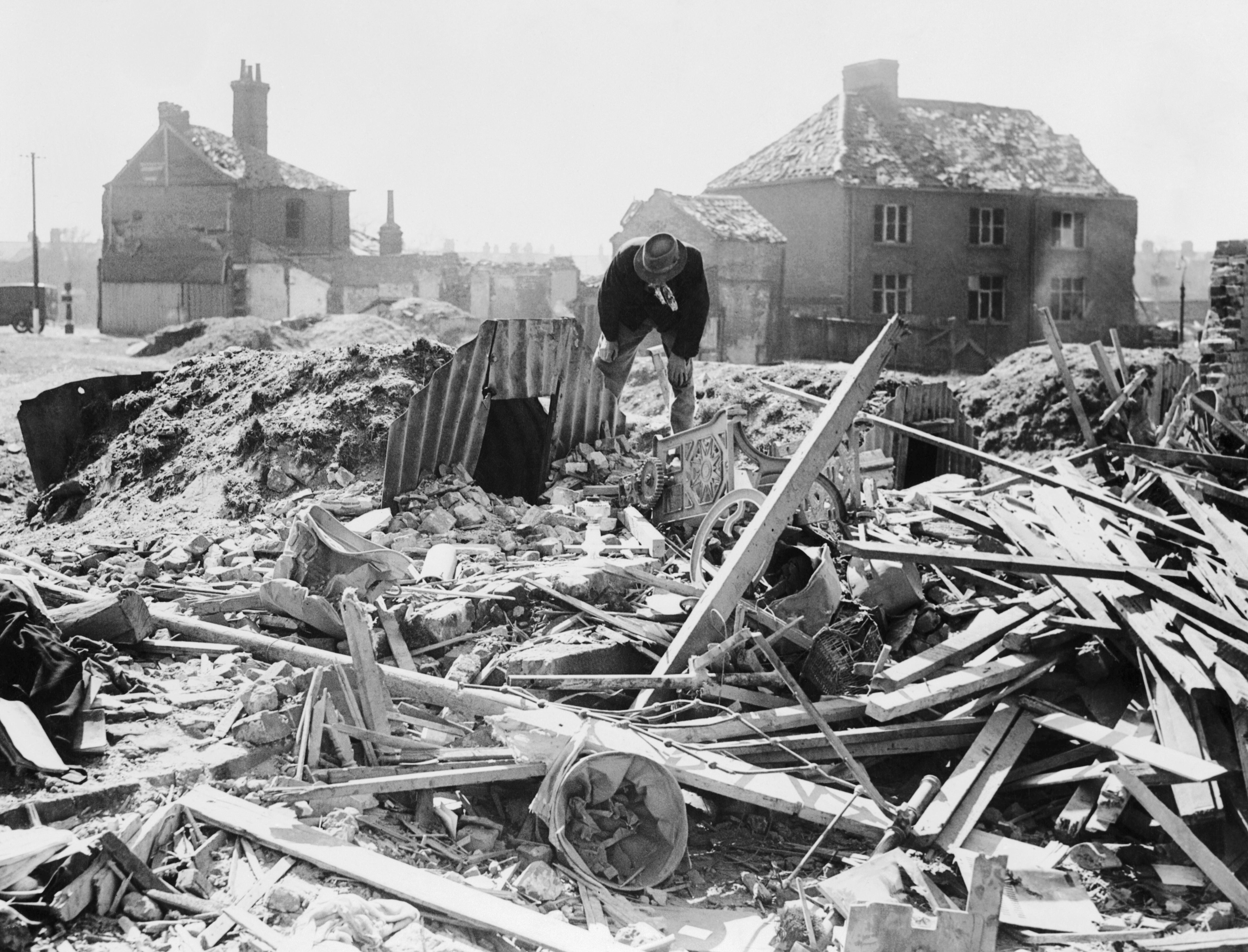
Three Anderson shelters that survived the destruction of the houses adjacent to them following a bombing raid in Norwich

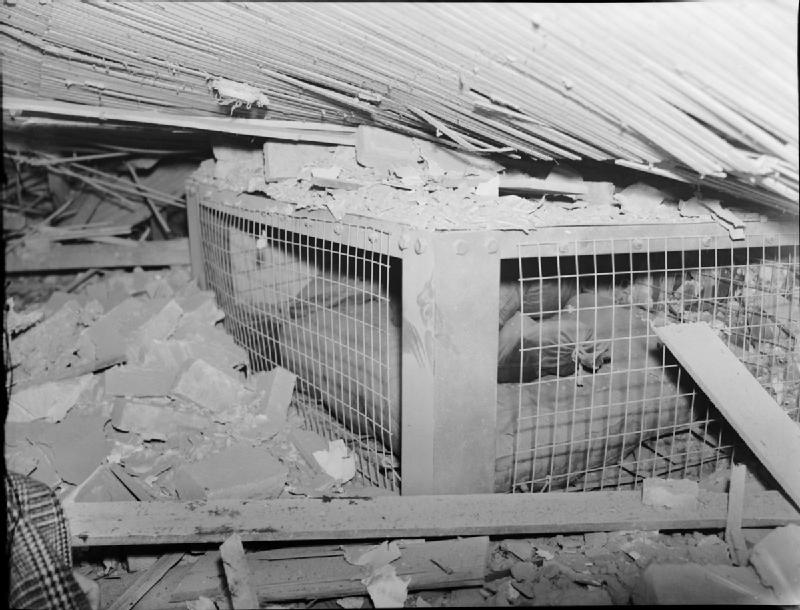
A Morrison shelter containing a dummy, after the house it was in had been destroyed as a test

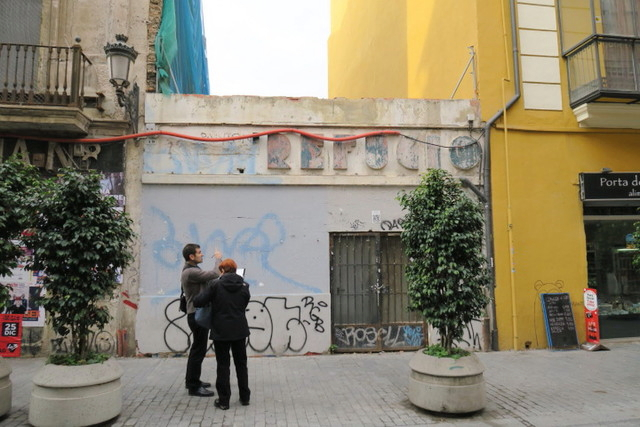
Air-raid shelter built during the Spanish Civil War in Valencia

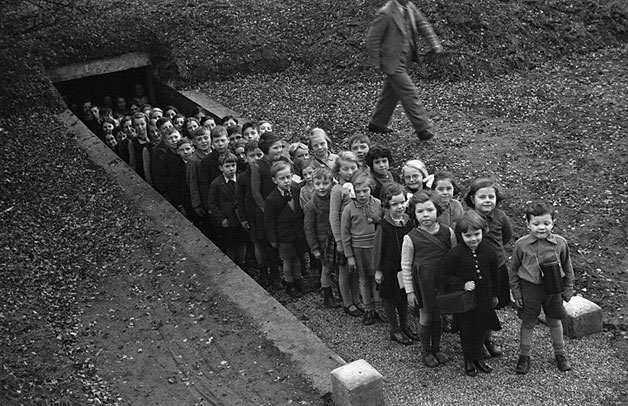
Children outside air raid shelter in Gresford, 1939

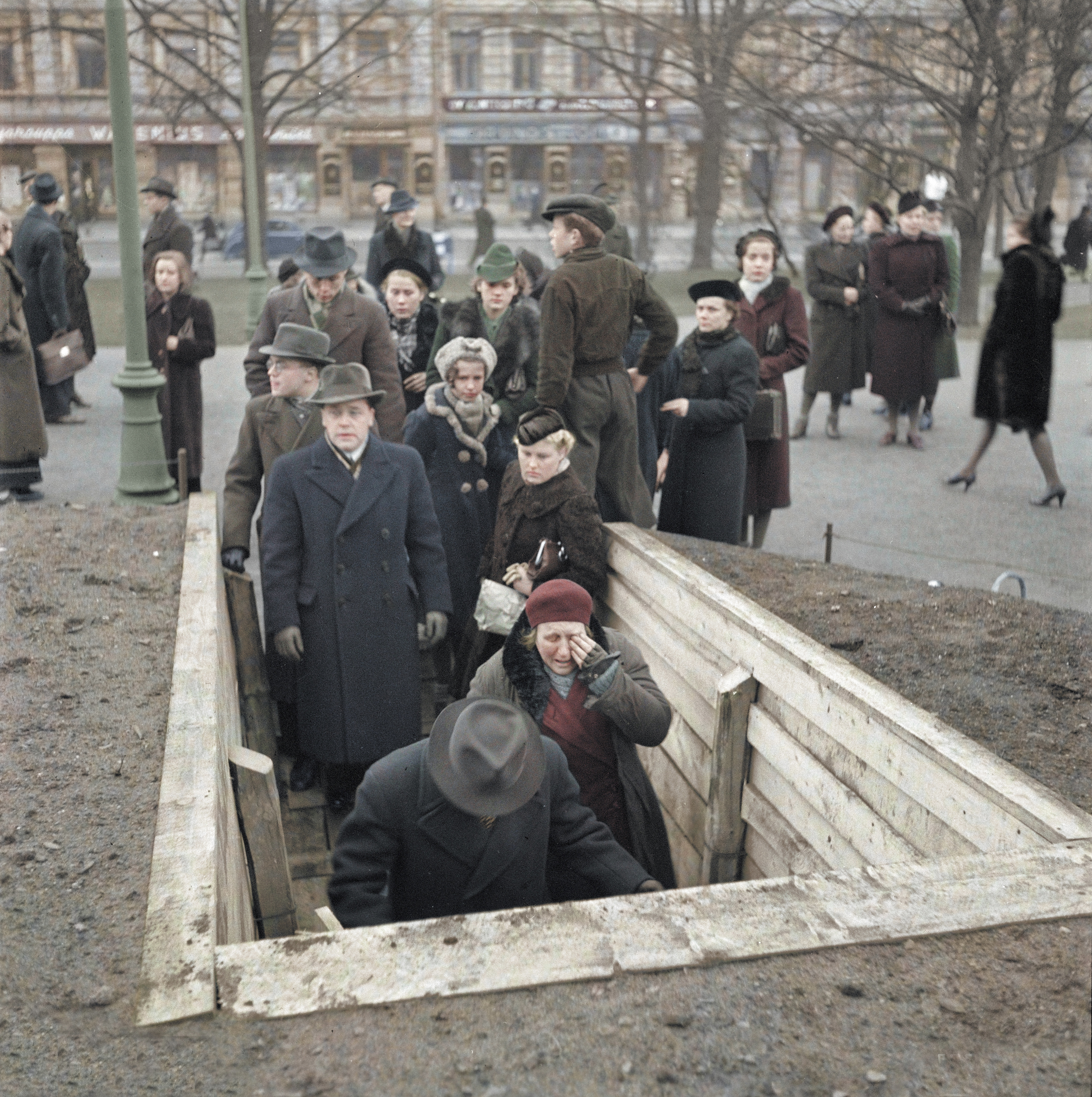
Finnish civilians enter a bomb shelter in Helsinki during the Winter War, 1939

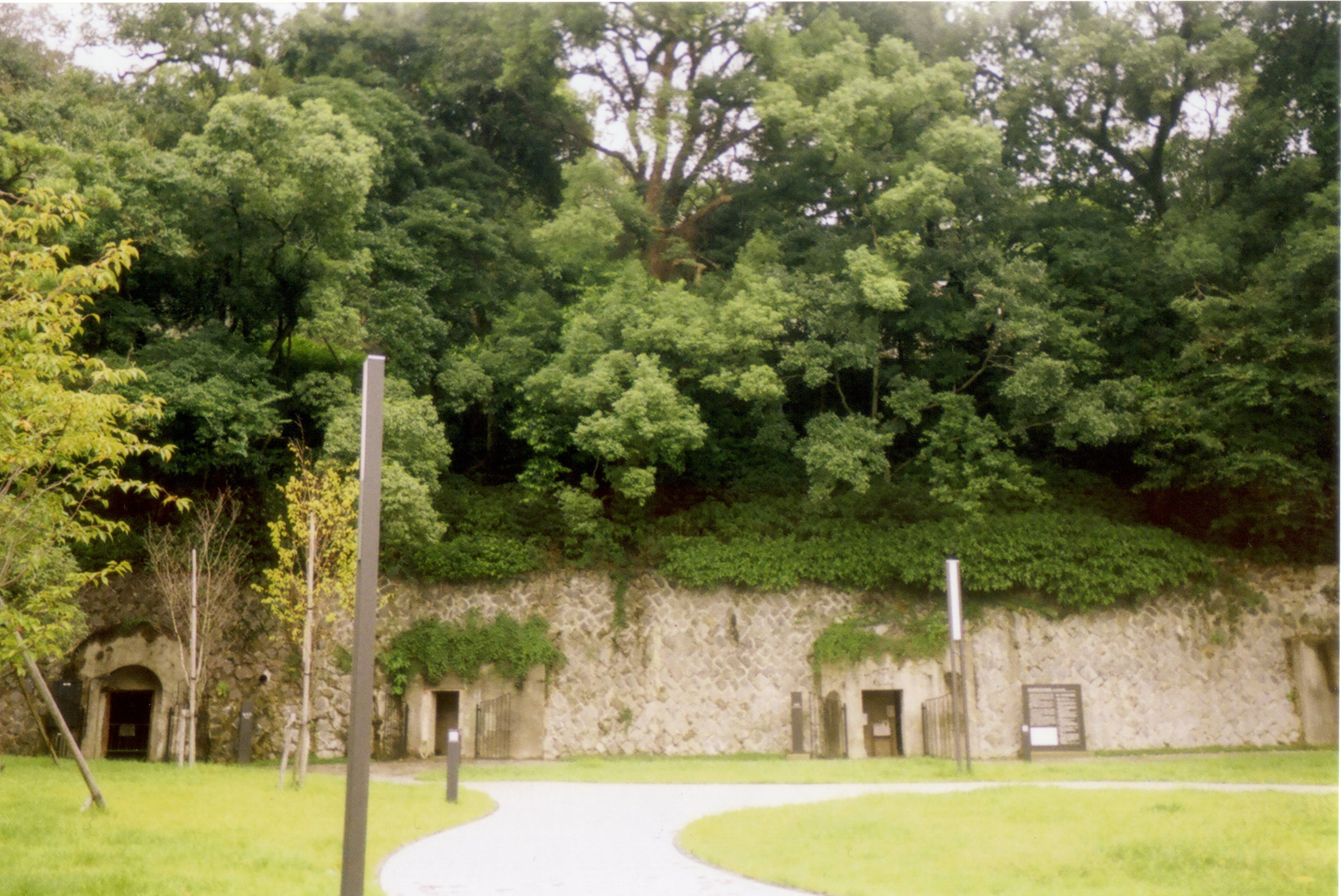
Air-raid shelter in Tateyama, Nagasaki

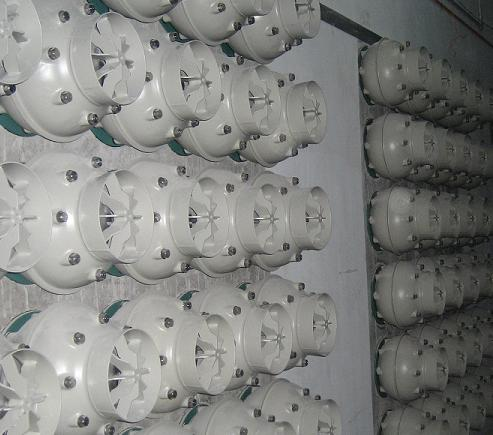
Blast protection valves installed in a bomb shelter

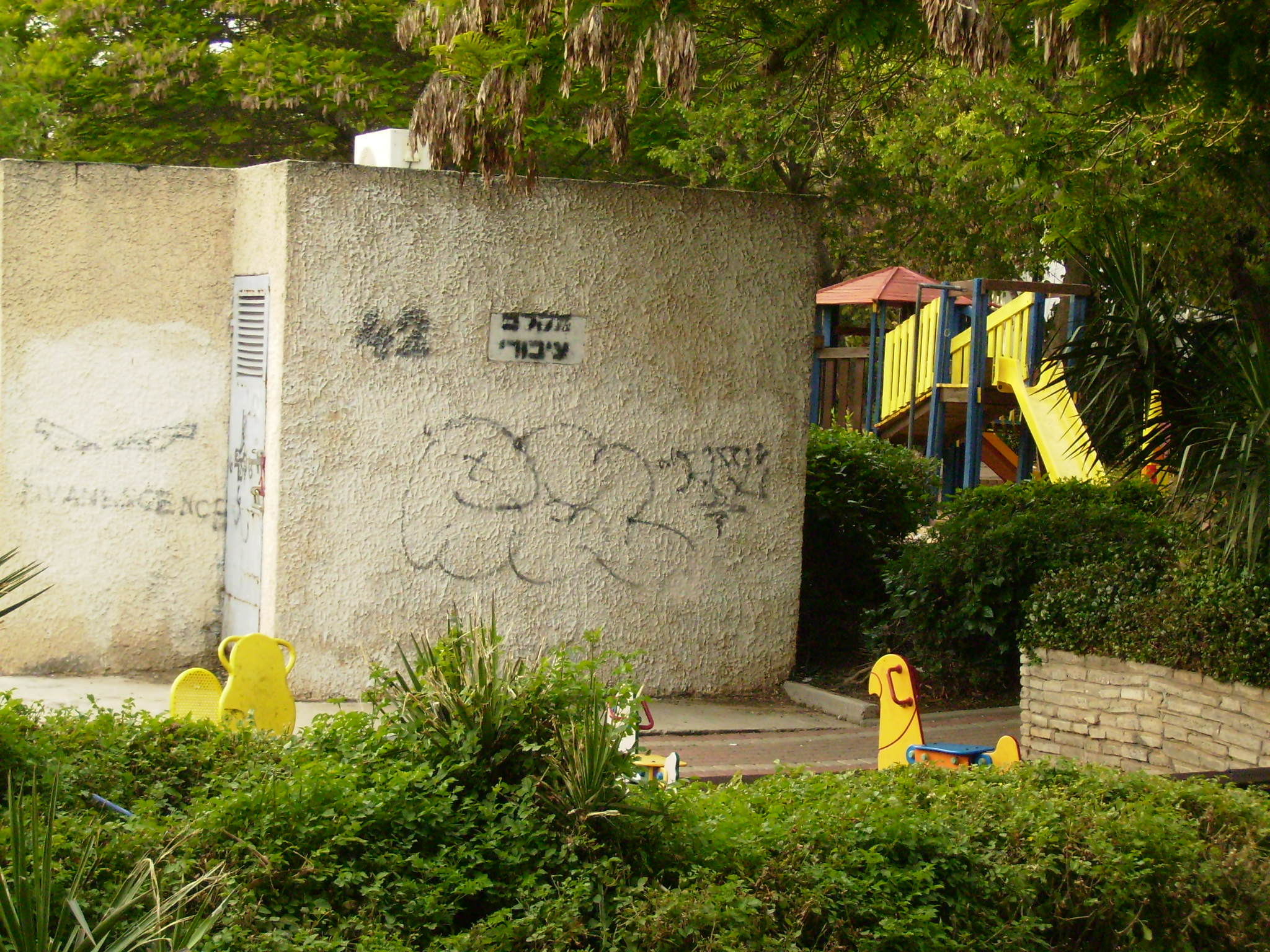
A communal air raid shelter located in a public garden in Holon, Israel

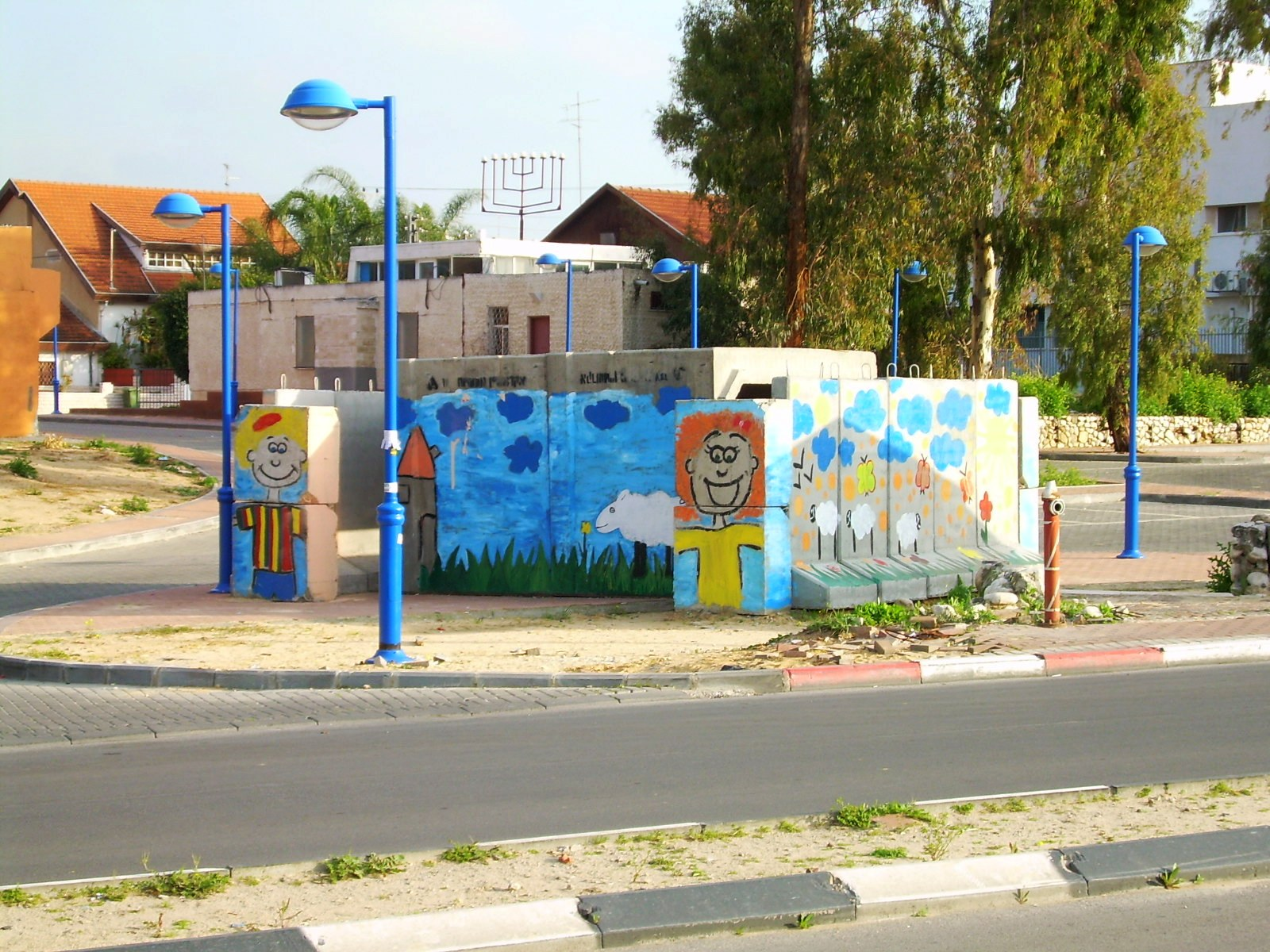
Entrance to a public bomb shelter in Sderot, Israel

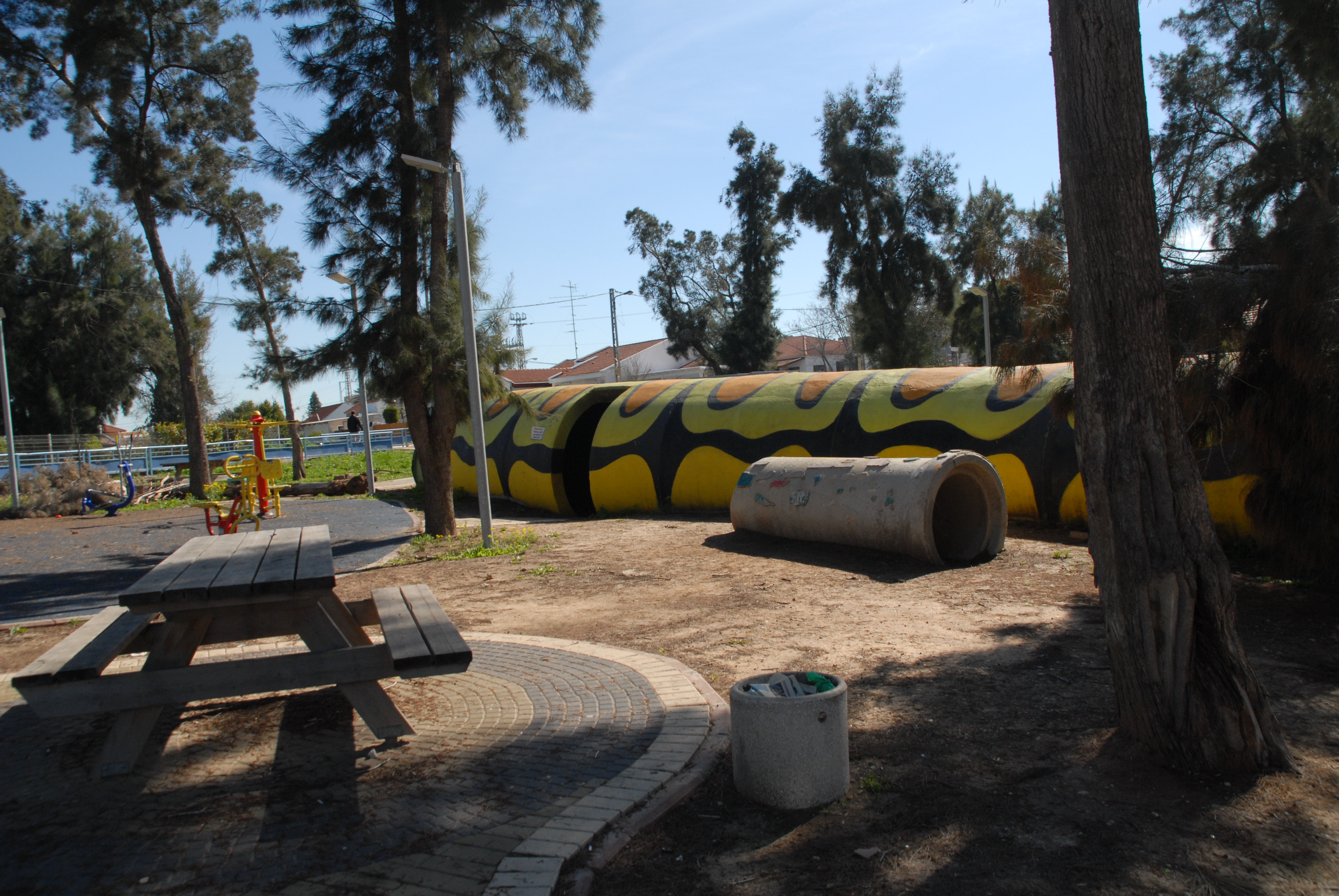
An example of a bomb shelter at a playground in Israel

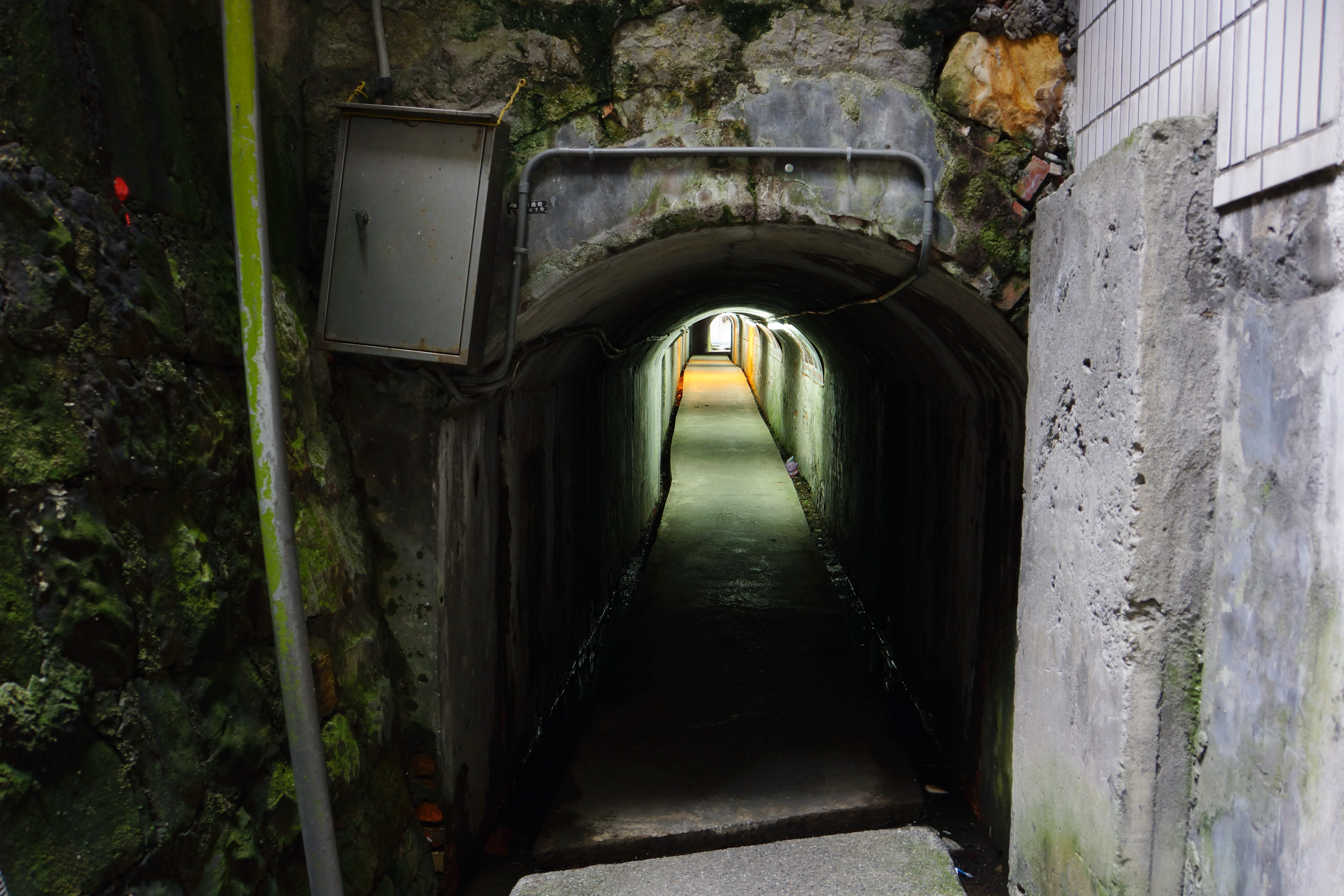
Japanese colonial period air raid shelter in Taiwan

== See also ==
- Air Raid Precautions in the United Kingdom
- Blast shelter
- Fallout shelter
- Underground living

== Bibliography ==
- Baker, John (1978). Enterprise vs Bureaucracy – The Development of Structural Air Raid Precautions during the 2nd World War. Pergamon Press.
- Ladd, Brian (2004). The companion guide to Berlin (illustrated ed.). Boydell & Brewer. p. 393. ISBN 978-1-900639-28-6.
