= Civil defence in Finland =

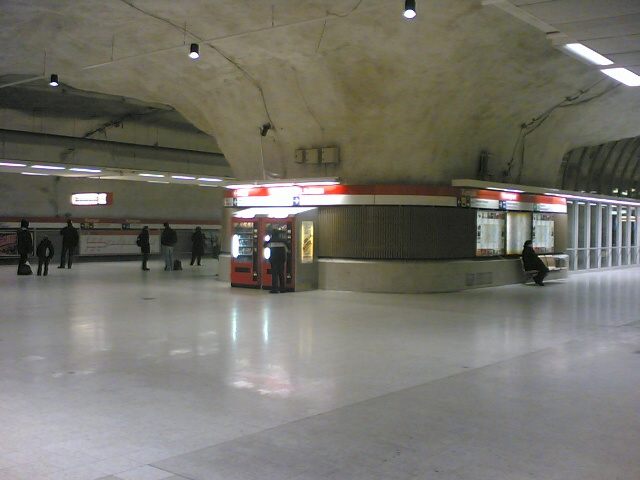
The Helsinki metro stations double as hard shelters. The Finnish shelter system is among the most comprehensive in the western world, being capable of accommodating the country's urban population completely.

Civil defence in Finland is the responsibility of the Ministry of Interior under the Civil Defence Act of 1958. It is directed to provide civil defence to protect persons and property in wartime as well as in peacetime. The act stipulates that the ministry is responsible for providing shelters in high-risk areas, for evacuating civilian population from threatened areas, and for limiting damage from natural disasters. In emergency situations, firefighting, rescue, ambulance, and first-aid services are coordinated with the civil defence effort. Civil defence operations are entirely a civilian responsibility.

The ministry delegates the implementation of national policy to county and municipal authorities, which act through locally appointed civil defence boards. These boards supervise operations from more than 100 civil defence centres designated throughout the country. Personnel in national and local government agencies, committed to civil defence in emergency situations, and in independent voluntary organizations that would come under their jurisdiction number over 100,000. Non-government organizations involved in civil defence activities include the Finnish Red Cross and the Rescue Service. Police are also assigned to reinforce civil defence workers as conditions require.

An alarm system is in place in urban centres to warn the civilian population of threatened attacks. During an emergency situation, instructions would be broadcast through normal media channels. The early warning civil defence system is tied into the nationwide military air surveillance system.

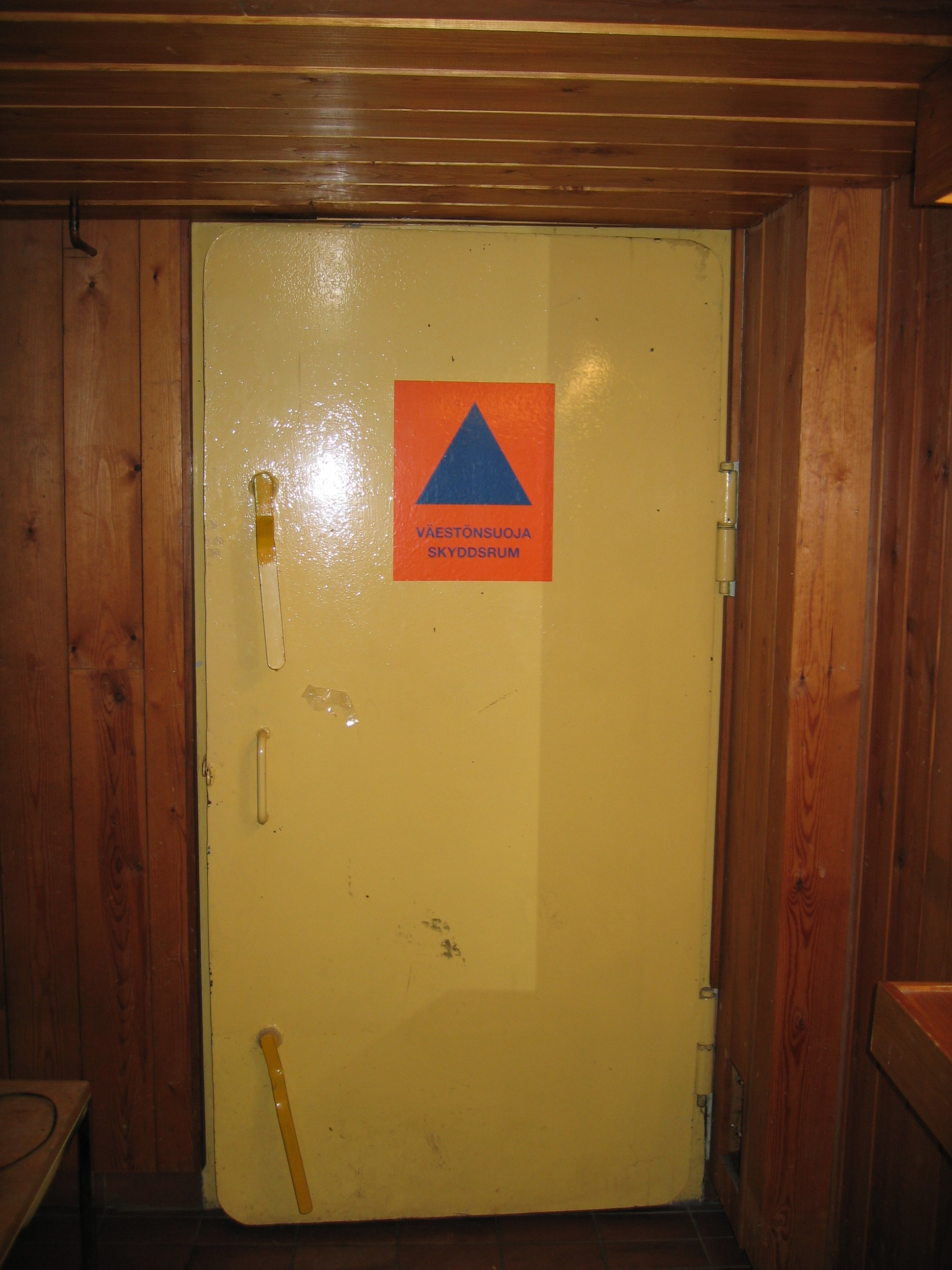
The fortified door of a shelter. Apartment blocks in Finland often have such shelters in the basement if there is no community shelter nearby. Note the international civil defence symbol on the door.

The Ministry of Interior maintains hard shelters, capable of accommodating 3.6 million persons, in cities and in other densely populated areas where two-thirds of the country's population live. They are built to withstand the detonation of a 100-kilotonne-of-TNT (420 TJ) nuclear bomb at ground zero. There is no shelter program in rural areas nor are most detached dwellings and townhouses equipped with shelters. About 10 per cent of the shelters are carved out of natural rock, but most are beneath office and residential buildings. Some are designed for multiple use as parking garages, schoolrooms, skating rinks, and swimming pools. By law, builders are obliged to include shelters in blocks measuring 3,000 cubic metres (110,000 cu ft) or more. In the late 1980s, in Helsinki, 536,000 spaces were provided, of which 118,000 were in large rock shelters and 14,000 were in subway stations. The shelter space was sufficient to accommodate over 100 per cent of the nighttime population of the city, but only 67 per cent of the daytime population.

The most serious shortcoming of Finland's civil defence system is that 1.5 million Finns had no access to shelters. Another reason for concern is that many shelters are poorly equipped and maintained. All shelters are supposed to be outfitted with self-contained power and ventilation systems, sanitary facilities, and emergency supplies. Nevertheless, inspections during 1986 found that two-thirds of shelters in private buildings had some deficiencies.

Contingency plans include massive evacuation of civilians from likely target areas, threatened with attack by conventional forces in time of war. Medical services for civilian casualties would be provided at local facilities in coordination with the civil defence branch of the Ministry of Social Affairs and Health. In the 1980s, civil defence authorities considered, however, that evacuation of the civilian population to escape fallout following a nuclear attack would be pointless, and no provision was made for such a contingency.

The public's perception of civil defence efforts was marked by considerable indifference during the 1980s. Although its system was far more complete than the systems in most countries of Western Europe, Finland's annual expenditure per capita on civil defence of US$12 was well below the rate of other Scandinavian countries, which averaged US$20 per capita. The nuclear accident at Chernobyl in the Soviet Union in 1986 underscored Finland's vulnerability and triggered renewed concern over shortcomings in the civil defence program. In response, the government announced plans in 1988 to introduce an automatic radiation surveillance network to supplement the existing manual one and to ensure that an outdoor alarm system was operational in all municipalities. Now this network has been completed and is in operation. In September 2026, more than 2,000 people, including volunteers, students and conscripts, took part in the Shelter 2026 exercise in Kuopio, rehearsing the protection of civilians during simulated cyberattacks on power and water infrastructure and the threat of missile strikes and marks Europe’s biggest civil defense exercise since the end of World War II.
