= Euamblypygi =

- A phrynid whipspider (Phrynus, Puerto Rico)

Scientific classification
- Kingdom: Animalia
- Phylum: Arthropoda
- Subphylum: Chelicerata
- Class: Arachnida
- Order: Amblypygi
- Suborder: Euamblypygi; Weygoldt, 1996

Infraorder of arachnids

Euamblypygi is one of the two suborders of whip spiders, the other being Paleoamblypygi. Euamblypygi includes three of the four living families of the order, with Paleoamblypygi represented today only by Paracharontidae.

== Description ==
Euamblypygids can be distinguished from paleoamblypygids by the method of the folding of their pedipalps when at rest. Paleoamblypygids fold their pedipalps within the vertical plane, with the femurs vertical when folded, whereas euamblypygids hold them at rest with the femurs horizontal or nearly horizontal. The morphology of euamblypygid pedipalps is also generally far more complex and derived. All extant whipspiders that possess eyes are euamblypygids, as Jorottui and Paracharon of the family Paracharontidae are eyeless.

== Taxonomy ==
Euamblypygi comprises the following families:

- Charontidae
- Phrynichidae
- Phrynidae

A fourth family, Charinidae, was included within the suborder until it was found to be a junior synonym of Charontidae in 2024.
