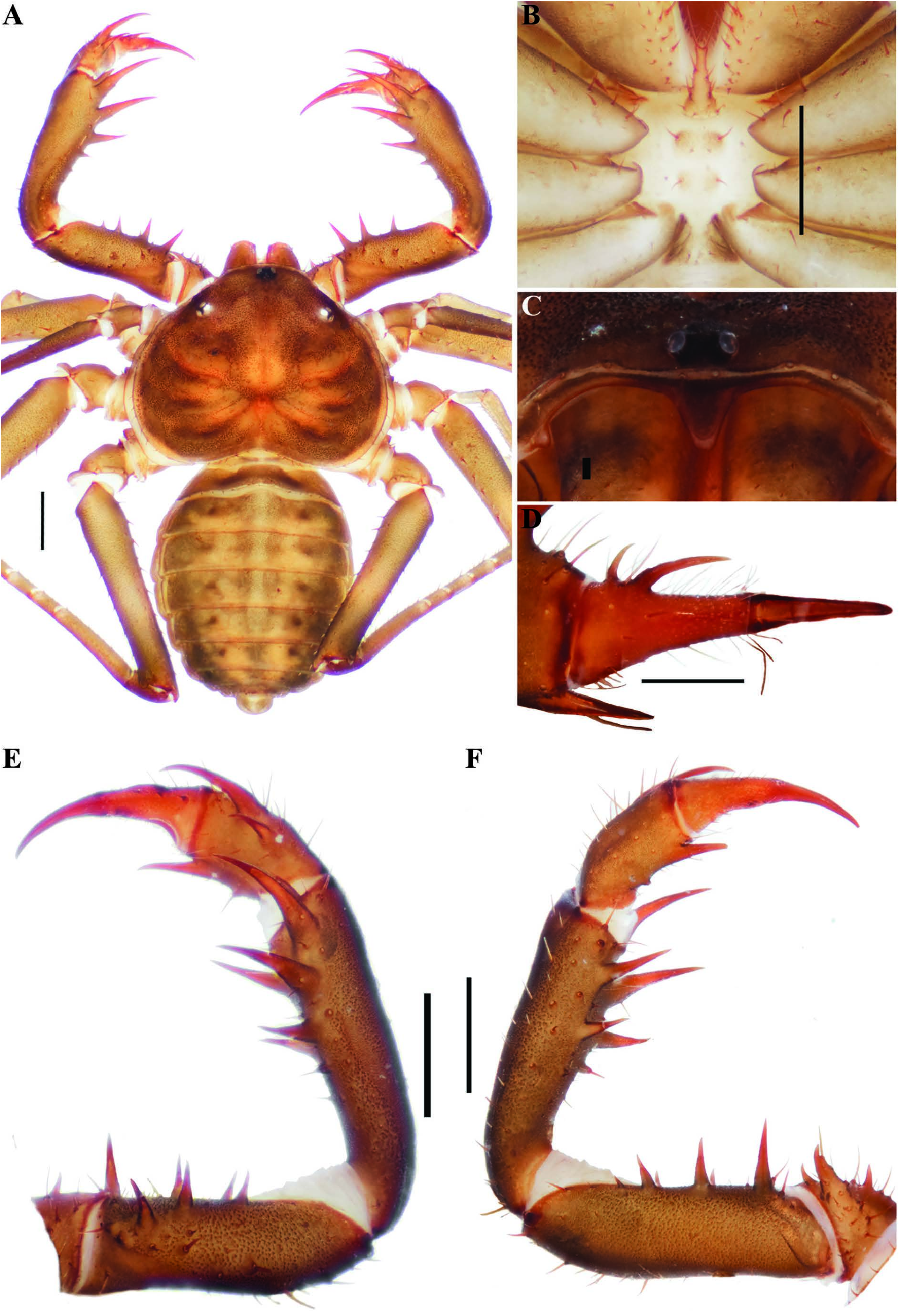

Scientific classification
- Kingdom: Animalia
- Phylum: Arthropoda
- Subphylum: Chelicerata
- Class: Arachnida
- Order: Amblypygi
- Family: Charontidae
- Genus: Charinus
- Species: C. pescotti

Binomial name
- Charinus pescotti Dunn, 1949

= Charinus pescotti =

Species of whip-spider

Charinus pescotti is a species of amblypygid arachnid (whip-spider) in the Charinidae family. It is endemic to Australia. It was described in 1949 by Australian arachnologist R. A. Dunn. The specific epithet pescotti honours Australian botanist Richard Pescott.

== Distribution and habitat ==
The species occurs in Far North Queensland, beneath rocks and bark and in plant litter on the forest floor. The type locality is Barron Falls, Kuranda.

== Behaviour ==
The whip-spiders are terrestrial predators.
