= Sarax ioanniticus =

Scientific classification
- Kingdom: Animalia
- Phylum: Arthropoda
- Subphylum: Chelicerata
- Class: Arachnida
- Order: Amblypygi
- Family: Charinidae
- Genus: Sarax
- Species: S. ioanniticus

Binomial name
- Sarax ioanniticus Kritscher, 1959

Synonyms
- Charinus ioanniticus (Kritscher, 1959); Lindosiella ioannitica Kritscher, 1959; Charinus ioanniticus (Miranda & Giupponi & Prendini & Scharff, 2021)

Species of arachnid

Sarax ioanniticus is a species of whipspider from the Eastern Mediterranean. It is among the only amblypygi found within the Western Palearctic region, and the only one which has been found in Europe.

== Description ==
Like others in its genus, Sarax ioanniticus is a small whipspider, with the carapaces of three females examined in a 2021 analysis ranging from 2.80 to 3.03 mm (0.110 to 0.119 in). Its eyes are reduced in size, and the lateral eye clusters are situated very close to the lateral carapace margin. S. ioanniticus reproduces mostly through parthenogenesis, possibly allowing it to more easily establish new populations.

== Taxonomic history ==
S. ioanniticus was originally described under the name Lindosiella ioannitica in 1959, and Peter Weygoldt moved it to the genus Charinus in 1972. It was placed in the genus Sarax in a 2021 revision of the Charinidae, based on morphological details such as the lateral eyes being close to the lateral edge of the carapace and finger-like female gonopods.

== Distribution and habitat ==
Generally, Sarax ioanniticus ranges around the coastline of the Eastern Mediterranean. Specimens collected in Athens in 2018 made it the only known species of whipspider found in continental Europe. In 2019, a population was discovered in the World War II-era Kleines Berlin air raid shelter in Trieste, Italy. This was the first record of Amblypygi from Italy, and the westernmost record of S. ioanniticus. It may have been introduced to Trieste by ship from Greece and Turkey, or historical objects stored in the air raid shelter. Its range overlaps with Sarax israelensis.

S. ioanniticus is synanthropic, generally inhabiting caves in human-disturbed areas. Specimens have been collected from manmade subterranean tunnels, cracks in walls, and under rocks.
