= Territoriality (nonverbal communication) =

Use of space to communicate ownership

In the study of nonverbal communication, territoriality refers to how people use space (territory) to communicate ownership or occupancy of areas and possessions. The concept was observed among animals. Personal space can be regarded as a bubble with a person at the center, forming an area that the individual wants to protect.

A measure of territoriality might be vehicle size. A large truck like the Ford F-450 might indicate a desire to control space on the highway. However, a small car such as the Smart, might indicate no need to occupy substantial space. Another example is students sitting in a class. Some students like to spread their stuff out to signal other students to maintain distance. Other students may leave room for others.

The term stimulated Edward T. Hall to create the word proxemics, which refers to how people use space, but not necessarily how people communicate ownership.

== In nation-states ==
Territoriality also describes nation-states. Nationalism may take the form of territoriality. National pride, religious practices, and politics all help define the territory that a country considers its own.

An example of this would be the conflict in Northern Ireland. The island of Ireland as a whole and the Republic of Ireland (which controls the majority of the island's area and residents) both have Catholic majorities while the United Kingdom and Northern Ireland (which is a part of the UK) have Protestant majorities. Territorial disputes on the island have been powered by religious differences.

== Models ==
=== Behavioral ===
Human territoriality has been claimed to be the product of human instinct, analogous to territorial behaviour in animals.

=== Social ===
Since the 1980s, human territoriality has been studied the product of sociopolitical processes. In International Relations, Ruggie claimed that territoriality was the organizing principle for international relations and could be contrasted with medieval heteronomous orders. Other authors questioned his broadly Westphalian view.

Wood claimed that "men go into women's spaces more than women enter men's spaces". She further asserted that men typically have a stronger sense of ownership and are more likely to challenge others' boundaries.

People respond to invasion of territory in different ways. Wood presented three common responses:

- When someone moves too close for comfort, one reaction is to back away.
- Another reaction is to signal that they should back away.
- When people have to fit into close spaces, submissive behaviors offer a way to show that one is not trying to dominate a space.

== See also ==
- Signalling (economics)
- Spraying (animal behavior) (territorial marking)
- Territory (animal)
- Territory (disambiguation)
- Phrynus longipes#Territoriality
