= Charon trebax =

Scientific classification
- Kingdom: Animalia
- Phylum: Arthropoda
- Subphylum: Chelicerata
- Class: Arachnida
- Order: Amblypygi
- Family: Charontidae
- Genus: Charon
- Species: C. trebax

Binomial name
- Charon trebax Harvey & West, 1998

Species of whip-spider

Charon trebax is a species of amblypygid arachnid (whip-spider) in the Charontidae family. It is endemic to Australia. It was described in 1998 by Australian arachnologists Mark Harvey and Paul West. The specific epithet trebax (Latin: ‘crafty’ or ‘cunning’) alludes to the species’ elusiveness and the difficulty in obtaining specimens.

== Distribution and habitat ==
The species occurs in North Queensland. The type locality is Emmett Creek, Cromarty, some 40 km south-east of Townsville.
