= Sarax kosulici =

Scientific classification
- Kingdom: Animalia
- Phylum: Arthropoda
- Subphylum: Chelicerata
- Class: Arachnida
- Order: Amblypygi
- Family: Charinidae
- Genus: Sarax
- Species: S. kosulici

Binomial name
- Sarax kosulici Ythier, 2026

Species of arachnid

Sarax kosulici is a species of whipspider in the family Charinidae. It is known only from the island of Ko Pha Ngan in Thailand. The specific epithet, kosulici, is in honor of the collector of the specimens, Dr. Ondřej Košulič. It was described in 2026.

== Description ==
Sarax kosulici is a rather small amblypygid, with the female holotype measuring 6.63 mm (0.261 in) in total body length. Its color, when preserved in alcohol, is yellowish to reddish brown. Males are currently unknown from this species.

== Distribution and ecology ==
Sarax kosulici is known only from the type locality of Ko Pha Ngan, where It is the only amblypygid species known. The specimens studied were collected from secondary forest mixed with coconut trees, near the ocean, in an area of moderate human disturbance.
