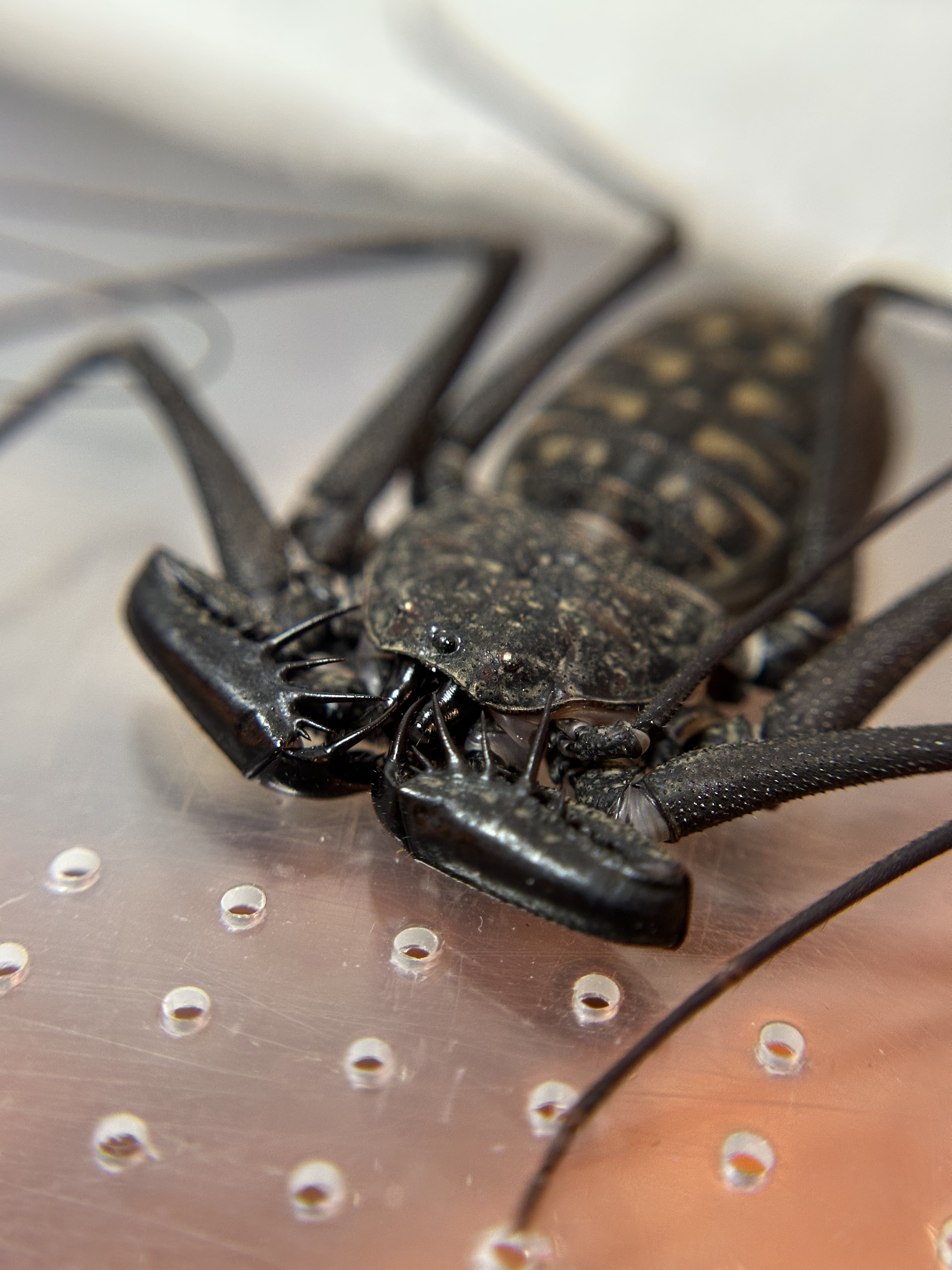

Scientific classification
- Domain: Eukaryota
- Kingdom: Animalia
- Phylum: Arthropoda
- Subphylum: Chelicerata
- Class: Arachnida
- Order: Amblypygi
- Family: Phrynidae
- Genus: Phrynus
- Species: P. maesi

Binomial name
- Phrynus maesi Armas, 1995

= Phrynus maesi =

Species of amblypygid

Phrynus maesi is a species of amblypygid in the family Phrynidae. It is endemic to Nicaragua, specifically among the volcanic mountains in the department of Jinotega and in the Bosawás Biosphere Reserve.

== Etymology ==
The genus Phrynus is directly derived from the Greek word "φρῦνος", meaning toad. The species is named in honor of Professor Jean-Michel Maes, one of the collectors of the type specimens.

== Description ==
Phrynus maesi is characterized by two sets of four legs, like other arachnids. The rear six legs are used for walking, while the first two are antenniform and act as antennae. Females have been recorded as approximately 19 mm in length, while males are slightly smaller, measuring about 13.6 mm (0.54 in). While their pedipalp spines are similar to females, they exhibit a distinctly large male genital operculum. The carapace is reddish-brown, with light markings radiating from the central groove. The femurs of the second to fourth legs are uniformly dark brown, lacking any bands. Like all amblypygids, Phrynus maesi produce no venom or silk.

== Distribution and habitat ==
Phrynus maesi has only been observed in the high altitude forests of Nicaragua, particularly above 1,300 m (4,300 ft) in altitude, where it inhabits humid subtropical environments in rocky locales. The species has been observed living under rocks and decomposing logs in dense forest environments.

== Taxonomy ==
Phrynus maesi is closely related to Phrynus operculatus and Phrynus whitei. It can be distinguished from P. operculatus by its broader genital operculum in males and narrower female gonopod sclerites. Unlike P. whitei the femurs on P. maesi lack banding.
