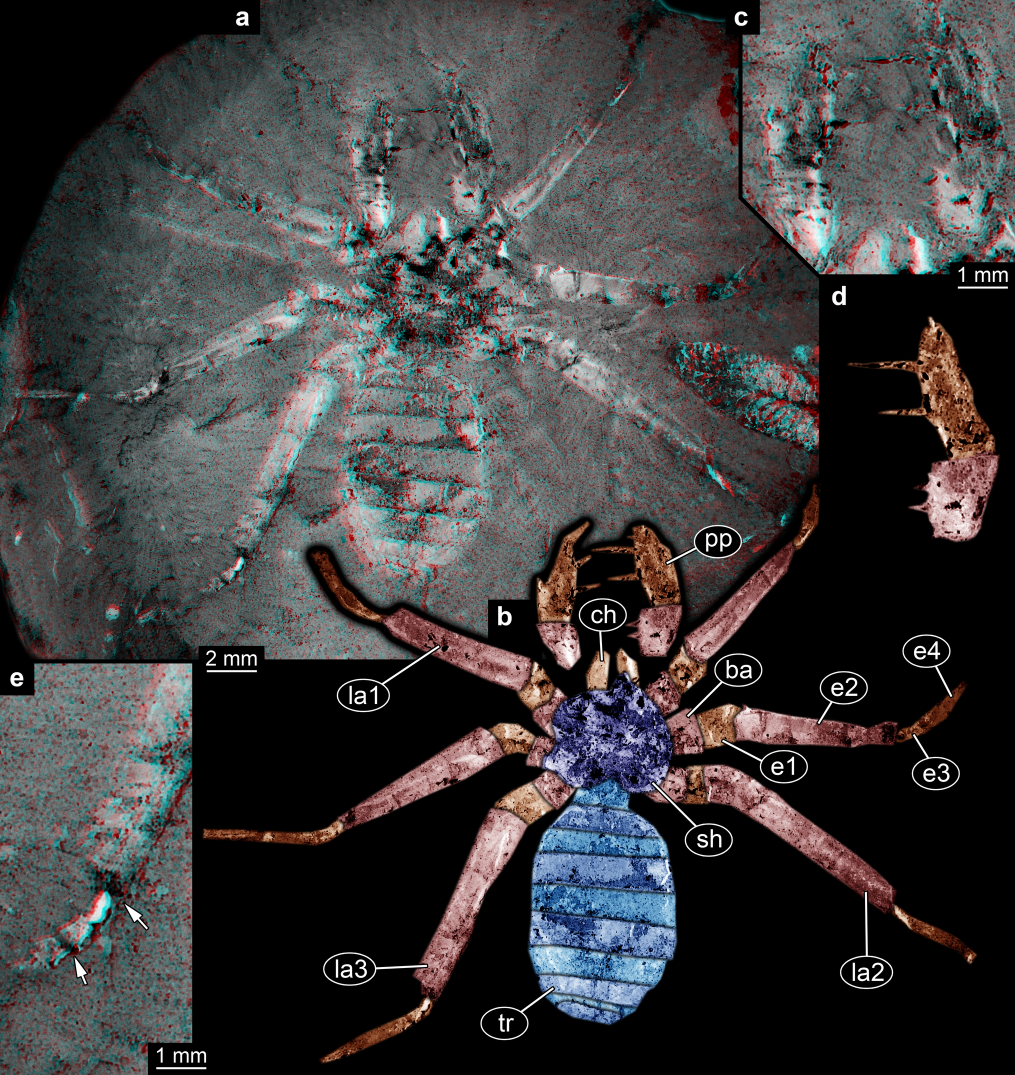
- Fossil specimen of W. anglica

Scientific classification
- Kingdom: Animalia
- Phylum: Arthropoda
- Subphylum: Chelicerata
- Class: Arachnida
- Order: Amblypygi
- Family: †Weygoldtinidae
- Genus: †Weygoldtina; Dunlop, 2018

Species
- Weygoldtina anglica Pocock, 1911; Weygoldtina scudderi Pocock, 1911

Synonyms
- Graeophonus anglicus Pocock, 1911; Graeophonus scudderi Pocock, 1911

= Weygoldtina =

Weygoldtina Temporal range: Pennsylvanian (Duckmantian–Kasimovian)

Extinct genus of arachnids

Weygoldtina is an extinct genus of tailless whip scorpion known from Carboniferous period, and the only known member of the family Weygoldtinidae. It is known from two species described from North America and England and originally described in the genus Graeophonus, which is now considered a nomen dubium.

== History ==
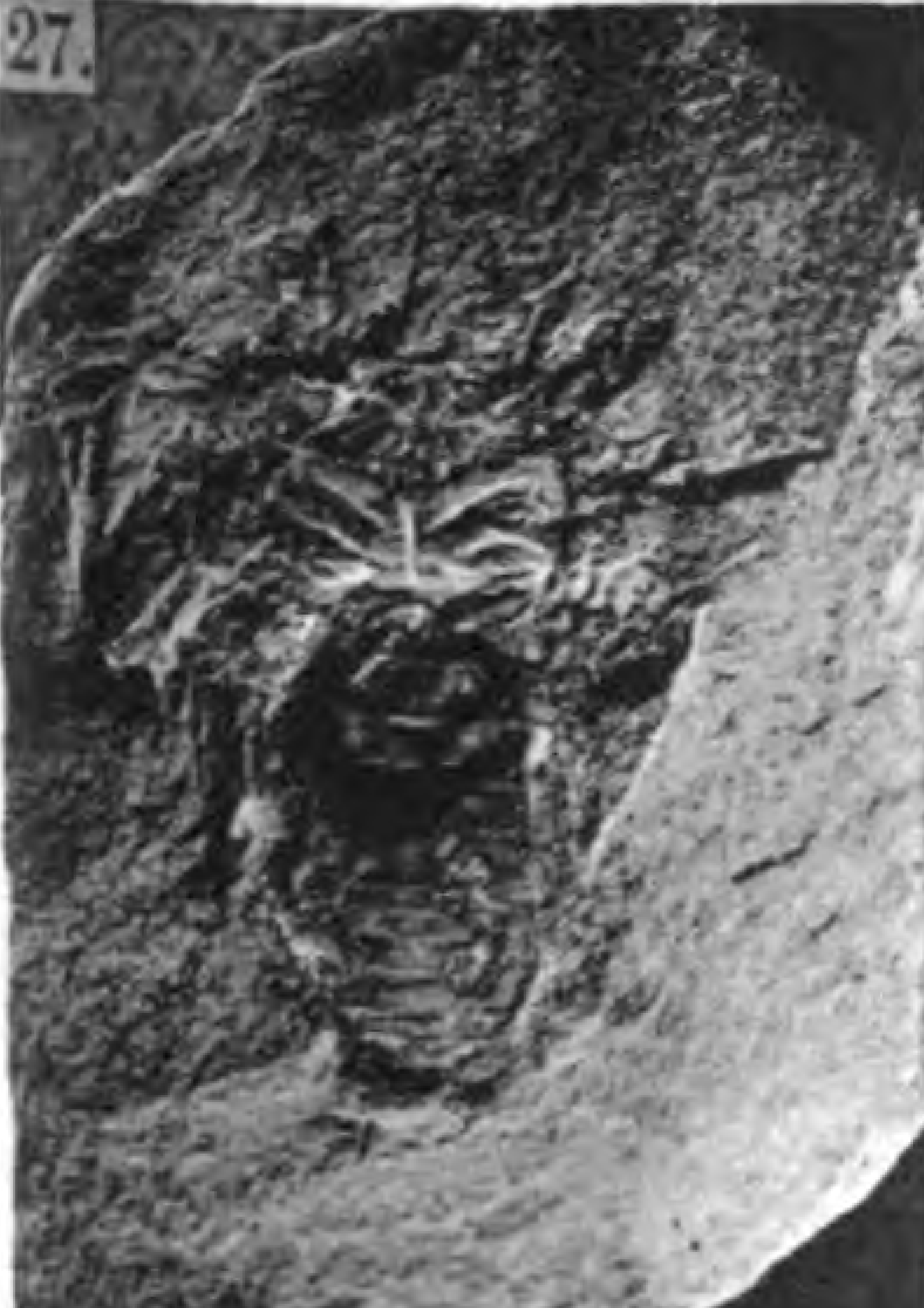
Weygoldtina scudderi (USNM 37969), originally described as Graeophonus carbonarius

A single fossil from the Cape Breton Island was interpreted as a fossil dragonfly larva and described by Samuel Hubbard Scudder in 1876 as Libellula carbonaria. The fossil was very incomplete, consisting of a solitary opisthosoma. With the discovery of more complete fossils from Mazon Creek, Illinois, and Joggins, Nova Scotia, Samuel Scudder redescribed the fossils as amblypygids and moved the species to a new genus, Graeophonus, as Graeophonus carbonarius. While describing the British species, Graeophonus anglicus, Reginald Innes Pocock noted significant differences between the Nova Scotian and more complete Mazon Creek fossils. As a result he erected the species Graeophonus scudderi to accommodate the Mazon Creek specimen, and restricted species G. carbonarius to the Canadian specimens. It was later suggested by Reginald Pocock in 1913 that the two species, G. carbonarius and G. scudderi, were indeed the same, and this has resulted in confusion over both the name to be used and number of species present in North America. Graeophonus anglicus has been found in the English Middle Coal Measures of Coseley, Staffordshire. Known from ten specimens that are now deposited in the British Museum, the species was named by Reginald Pocock in 1911.

However, in 2018, researchers considered that the genus Graeophonus is invalid, because the holotype specimen of G. carbonarius (Libellula carbonaria) is poorly preserved and hard to identify as an amblypygid. Even in 1911, Pocock considered that the holotype specimen possibly did not belong to an amplypygid. More confusingly, A.I. Petrunkevitch suggested to use another more complete specimen as the holotype in 1913, even though the original holotype specimen was not lost at that time. To solve problems caused by this, Jason A. Dunlop erected a new genus, Weygoldtina, and placed most specimens of G. carbonarius and G. scudderi into the Weygoldtina scudderi, with G. anglicus being renamed as Weygoldtina anglica.

== Morphology ==
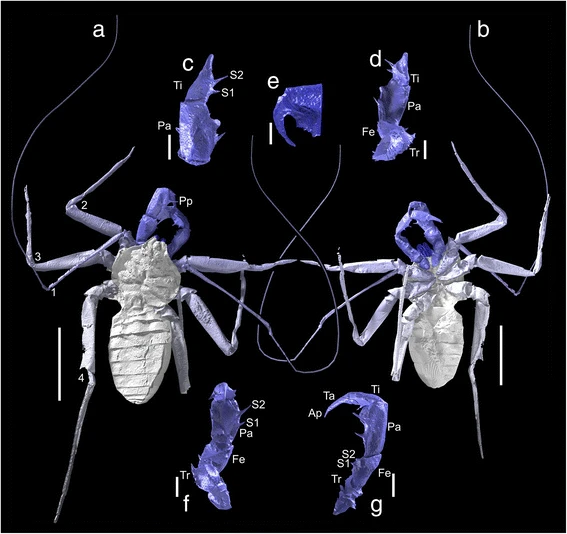
Tomographic (left) and illustrated (right) reconstruction of W. anglica

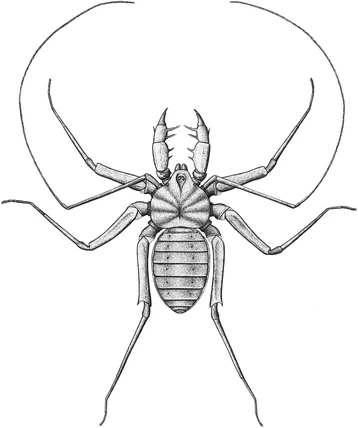

W. scudderi had body length about 17 millimetres (0.67 in).

Body length of W. anglica ranges from 11–13 millimetres (0.43–0.51 in) for complete specimens, and the partly complete 18 millimetres (0.71 in) long specimen shows a distinct pear-shaped ocular tubercle on the carapace. CT data confirmed the presence of lateral eye tubercles. The center of the dorsal shield has a deep depression which probably acted as an attachment site for the muscles of the sucking stomach. Raptorial pedipalps were not mantis-like shaped like most of modern amplypygid, but were similar to ones of the modern genus Paracharon. The main difference of pedipalps compared to Paracharon is the spine orientation. The pedipalp spines in Paracharon appear to be almost parallel and slightly tilted outwards; in W. anglica, the angle between the spines appears to be larger, at least 90 degrees. This character suggests that W. anglica used its pedipalps not exactly in the same way as the modern Paracharon. Study in 2021 shows two prominent spines on each pedipalp, which were not recognized before. Although the first pairs of legs are not completely preserved, they are probably long and antenna-like, the same as modern amblypygids.

The main difference between the two species is the anterior projection from the prosomal dorsal shield. It is slightly wider, shorter, and more diffuse in W. scudderi.

== Classification ==
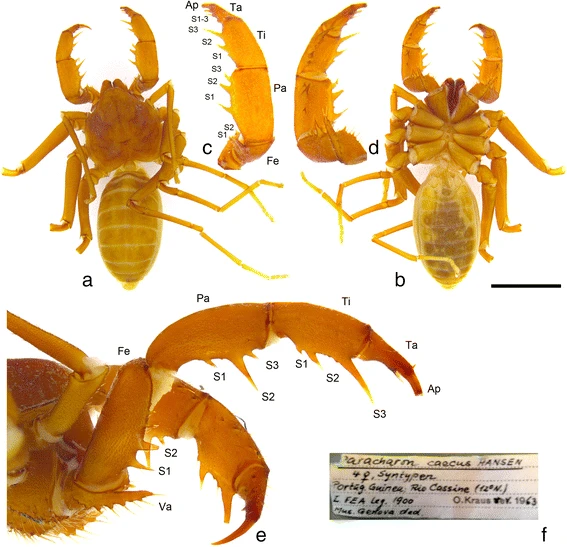
Photos of the only living paleoamblypygid tailless whip scorpion, Paracharon caecus

The morphology of both the abdomen and pedipalps in Weygoldtina is very similar to the modern genus Paracharon. In 2007, Weygoldtina (Graeophonus at that time) was placed in Paracharontidae, the same family as Paracharon. While Paracharon is notably blind, this is thought to be a secondary result of living almost exclusively within termite mounds. Thus, its blindness was not considered a reason to exclude Graeophonus from Paracharontidae. However, in 2017, Weygoldtina was rejected from Paracharontidae, and treated as stem-paleoamblypygid. Paleoamblypygi is a monophyletic suborder that contains Paracharon, Weygoldtina, in addition Paracharonopsis cambayensis that is described from Eocene Cambay amber. In 2018, new family Weygoldtinidae is given for Weygoldtina. Differences in morphology of the pedipalps and the first pair of legs in Paracharon and Weygoldtina may show closer relationship of Paracharon and Euamblypygi, but also this could be a point to an apomorphic condition of Weygoldtina. Researchers claimed that it needs to be considered that Weygoldtina is not as similar to Paracharon as a brief look might suggest, but is characterised by its own specialisations.
