= Charon oenpelli =

Scientific classification
- Kingdom: Animalia
- Phylum: Arthropoda
- Subphylum: Chelicerata
- Class: Arachnida
- Order: Amblypygi
- Family: Charontidae
- Genus: Charon
- Species: C. oenpelli

Binomial name
- Charon oenpelli Harvey & West, 1998

Species of whip-spider

Charon oenpelli is a species of amblypygid arachnid (whip-spider) in the Charontidae family. It is endemic to Australia. It was described in 1998 by Australian arachnologists Mark Harvey and Paul West. The specific epithet oenpelli refers to the type locality.

== Description ==
The species is a predatory cave dweller and has some troglophilic characteristics, including reduced pedipalps and eyes as well as pale colouration.

== Distribution and habitat ==
The species occurs in Arnhem Land, in the tropical Top End of the Northern Territory. The type locality is a sandstone cave system near Oenpelli Reservoir, some 9 km south of Oenpelli.
