= Phrynus abstrusus =

Scientific classification
- Kingdom: Animalia
- Phylum: Arthropoda
- Subphylum: Chelicerata
- Class: Arachnida
- Order: Amblypygi
- Family: Phrynidae
- Genus: Phrynus
- Species: P. abstrusus

Binomial name
- Phrynus abstrusus Cazzaniga & Prendini, 2026

Species of arachnid

Phrynus abstrusus is a troglophilous species of amblypygid from the southern United States. It was previously considered to be a population of Phrynus operculatus. P. abstrusus differs from most other species in its genus in lacking most pigment, with a translucent cuticle making some internal organs visible within the opisthosoma. In addition to pigmentation, it can be separated from P. operculatus by the morphology of the spines on their raptorial pedipalps, and by the anatomy of the female gonopods. The type material was collected from rock crevices and a small cave in road cuts in southern Texas. The species name abstrusus, meaning secluded or concealed, refers to the species' inhabiting crevices.
