= Charon gervaisi =

Scientific classification
- Kingdom: Animalia
- Phylum: Arthropoda
- Subphylum: Chelicerata
- Class: Arachnida
- Order: Amblypygi
- Family: Charontidae
- Genus: Charon
- Species: C. gervaisi

Binomial name
- Charon gervaisi Harvey & West, 1998

Species of whip-spider

Charon gervaisi is a species of amblypygid arachnid (whip-spider) in the Charontidae family. It was described in 1998 by Australian arachnologists Mark Harvey and Paul West. The specific epithet gervaisi honours French palaeontologist and entomologist Paul Gervais (1816–1879), who described the first species in the genus.

== Distribution and habitat ==
The species occurs on the tropical Australian territory of Christmas Island in the eastern Indian Ocean. The type locality is a wood pile at the Boat Club, Flying Fish Cove.
