= Union territory (disambiguation) =

Union territory is a kind of administrative division in India. It may also refer to:

- Naypyidaw Union Territory, a division of Burma
- Union-controlled territory in the American Civil War
  - Specifically, Union areas designated as "territories" rather than states during the American Civil War

== See also ==
- Federal territory
- Union State, post-Soviet association
- National Union for Territories Group
- Territory (disambiguation)
- Union (disambiguation)
