= Charinus santandereanus =

Scientific classification
- Kingdom: Animalia
- Phylum: Arthropoda
- Subphylum: Chelicerata
- Class: Arachnida
- Order: Amblypygi
- Family: Charinidae
- Genus: Charinus
- Species: C. santandereanus

Binomial name
- Charinus santandereanus Villareal et al., 2025

Species of arachnid

Charinus santandereanus is a species of whipspider found in Colombia. The type specimens of this species, two females, were collected from the aphotic zone of a wet cave in the Santander Department, Colombia. The species is known only from the cave in which the type specimens were found.

== Description ==
The median pair of eyes present in most amblypygi is absent in C. santandereanus, with only the lateral eyes present. Lack of median eyes differentiates it from other Colombian Charinus species, while it can be separated from the most morphologically similar congener in Venezuela that also lacks median eyes by the arrangement of spines on its pedipalps.
