= Territorialism =

Territorialism can refer to:

- Animal territorialism, the animal behavior of defending a geographical area from intruders
- Environmental territorialism, a stance toward threats posed toward individuals, communities or nations by environmental events and trends
- Jewish Territorialist Organization, a Jewish political movement in the early 20th century advocating settlement in a number of territories outside of the Holy Land as an alternative to Zionism
- Territorialist School, a contemporary Italian approach to urban and regional planning
- Land tenure, the legal regime in which land is owned by an individual
  - Feudalism, a legal and military system of hierarchical land holding
- Statism, the belief that the state should control economic or social policy, or both, to some degree
  - Statism in Shōwa Japan

== See also ==
- Territory (disambiguation)
