= Charinus acosta =

Scientific classification
- Kingdom: Animalia
- Phylum: Arthropoda
- Subphylum: Chelicerata
- Class: Arachnida
- Order: Amblypygi
- Family: Charontidae
- Genus: Charinus
- Species: C. acosta

Binomial name
- Charinus acosta Quintero, 1983

Species of arachnid

Charinus acosta is a species of whipspider endemic to Cuba. It was described in 1983.

== Description ==
Charinus acosta is a very small amblypygid, with specimens typically only reaching a few millimeters across the carapace. Specimens typically measure between 4.0 and 6.3 mm (0.16 and 0.25 in) total body length. The tubercle on which the median eyes (of the 3 groups of 8 total eyes most amblypygi possess) lie is reduced in size, although the median eyes are well developed. Color overall is light yellowish brown.

=== Parthenogenesis ===
Unusually among amblypygi, C. acosta is parthenogenic, and only females are known. Females observed during a 2005 study produced between 3 and 7 young at a time, with an average of 4.2 across six observed broods.

=== Gigantism ===
A paper published in 2018 recorded an instance of gigantism in a subpopulation of C. acosta living within abandoned military tunnels beneath the Parque zoológico de Santiago de Cuba. The giant specimens measured up to 8.9 mm (0.35 in) body length, compared to the typical range of around four to six millimeters. The subpopulation is believed by the author to have attained this large size in less than 30 years of separation.

== Distribution and habitat ==
Charinus acosta is endemic to Cuba, and has been found in many regions throughout the main island of the country. The species is characteristically found on the undersides of partially buried stones, with populations often localized to very small sites less than 100 m^{2} (1,100 sq ft). Populations are often associated with river basins, sometimes along banks or intermittently flowing stream beds, and often within forest or scrubland. Often, C. acosta inhabits sites that have been highly impacted by humans, which may indicate human influence in spreading the species to new localities. The species' highly localized distribution may also be the remnants of a more extensive past range reduced by human habitat destruction.
