= Phrynus exsul =

Scientific classification
- Kingdom: Animalia
- Phylum: Arthropoda
- Subphylum: Chelicerata
- Class: Arachnida
- Order: Amblypygi
- Family: Phrynidae
- Genus: Phrynus
- Species: P. exsul

Binomial name
- Phrynus exsul Harvey, 2002

Species of arachnid

Phrynus exsul is a species of whipspider from Indonesia. It is the only species in the family Phrynidae found outside of the New World.

== Description ==
Phrynus exsul is morphologically quite similar to other phrynid species, with one of its most distinctive features being an increased number of trichobothria present on the distitibia of the walking legs compared to other species of its family. It is a large whipspider, with the male paratype (the larger of the two type specimens) measuring 38 mm (1.5 in) in total body length excluding the chelicerae, with a single antenniform leg measuring 252 mm (9.9 in) in total. The pedipalps are short and strong.

The coloration of adults is blackish overall, but the nymphal instars are mostly white, with only their pedipalps being black. The earliest instars have small dark spots on mostly white bodies with transparent cuticle, with the black spots expanding from the fourth instars onward and the white areas darkening to yellowish. Larger but still immature specimens observed in the wild in caves have acquired the dark coloration of adults. This coloration of nymphs had not been observed in other Phrynids as of 2010, with only the Arabian Phrynichid Phrynichus dhofarensis showing similar color in the nymphal stages. The reason for the color anomaly remains unknown.

=== Reproductive biology ===
P. exsul shows very little sexual dimorphism overall, with the pedipalps being the same between males and females, a commonly sexually dimorphic feature among amblypygi. However, the males possess an additional spine on both the anteroventral and anterodorsal margin of the trochanter of their pedipalps (5 and 4 respectively).

Similarly to other amblypygi, courtship (observed in captivity during a 2010 study) involves the male rythmically jerking his antenniform legs and tapping the female. The female mostly remains motionless until lured over the spermatophore. After depositing the spermatophore, the male spends 4 to 6 minutes "embracing" the spermatophore head with his pedipalp tarsi, while intensifying his antenniform leg jerking, before stepping back and luring the female to take up the spermatophore with more courtship movements. When researchers attempted to pair a female that was later found to be a few weeks from molting, the female "ferociously" attempted to kill the male, who had to be rescued, losing an antenniform leg in the attack.

Unusually, the egg sac begins dull greyish colored, in contrast to the shiny greenish of other amblypygi. Eventually, the wall of the egg sac hardened to shiny and brownish as in other amblypygi. Development of the egg sac laid by an observed captive female took around 4 months until the young hatched.

== Distribution and ecology ==
Phrynus exsul occurs on the Indonesian islands of Flores (the type locality) and Rinca. It inhabits both caves and forests. It is unknown how the species ended up in Indonesia, which is otherwise inhabited by Charontid species. As of 2010 there was no evidence of past broader distribution of the Phrynidae, leaving rafting across the Pacific or past human introduction as possible explanations for its enigmatic presence in Southeast Asia.
