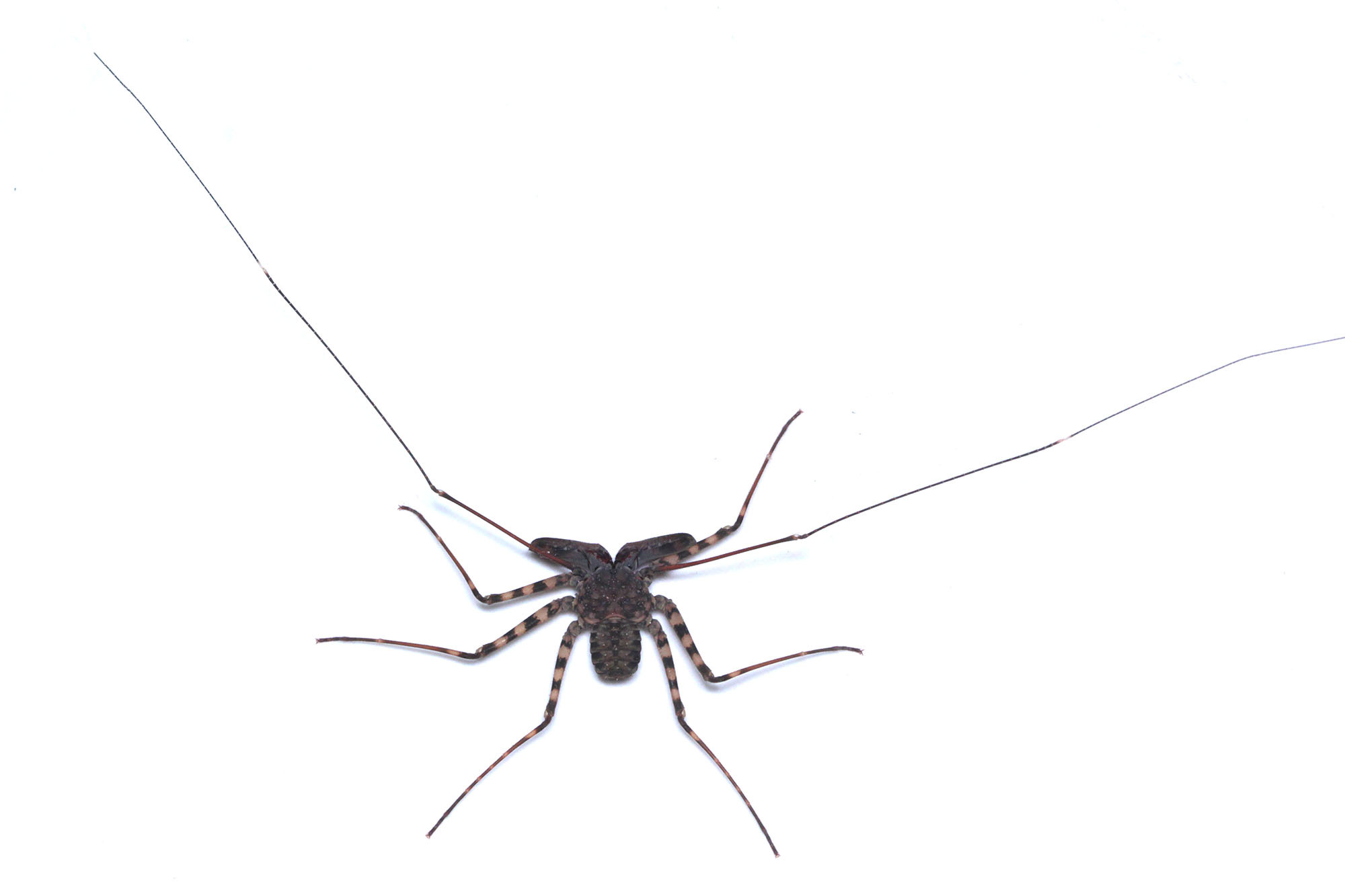

Scientific classification
- Kingdom: Animalia
- Phylum: Arthropoda
- Subphylum: Chelicerata
- Class: Arachnida
- Order: Amblypygi
- Family: Charontidae
- Genus: Charon
- Species: C. grayi

Binomial name
- Charon grayi (Gervais, 1842)

Synonyms
- Phrynus grayi Gervais, 1842; Charon hoeveni Karsch, 1880; Charon beccarii Thorell, 1888; Charon papuanus Thorell, 1888; Charon subterraneus Thorell, 1888

= Charon grayi =

Species of whip-spider

Charon grayi, the giant whip-spider, is a species of whip spider found in Malaysia, Singapore, Philippines, Indonesia, Papua New Guinea, the Solomon Islands and Palau. This whip-spider usually lives in caves.
