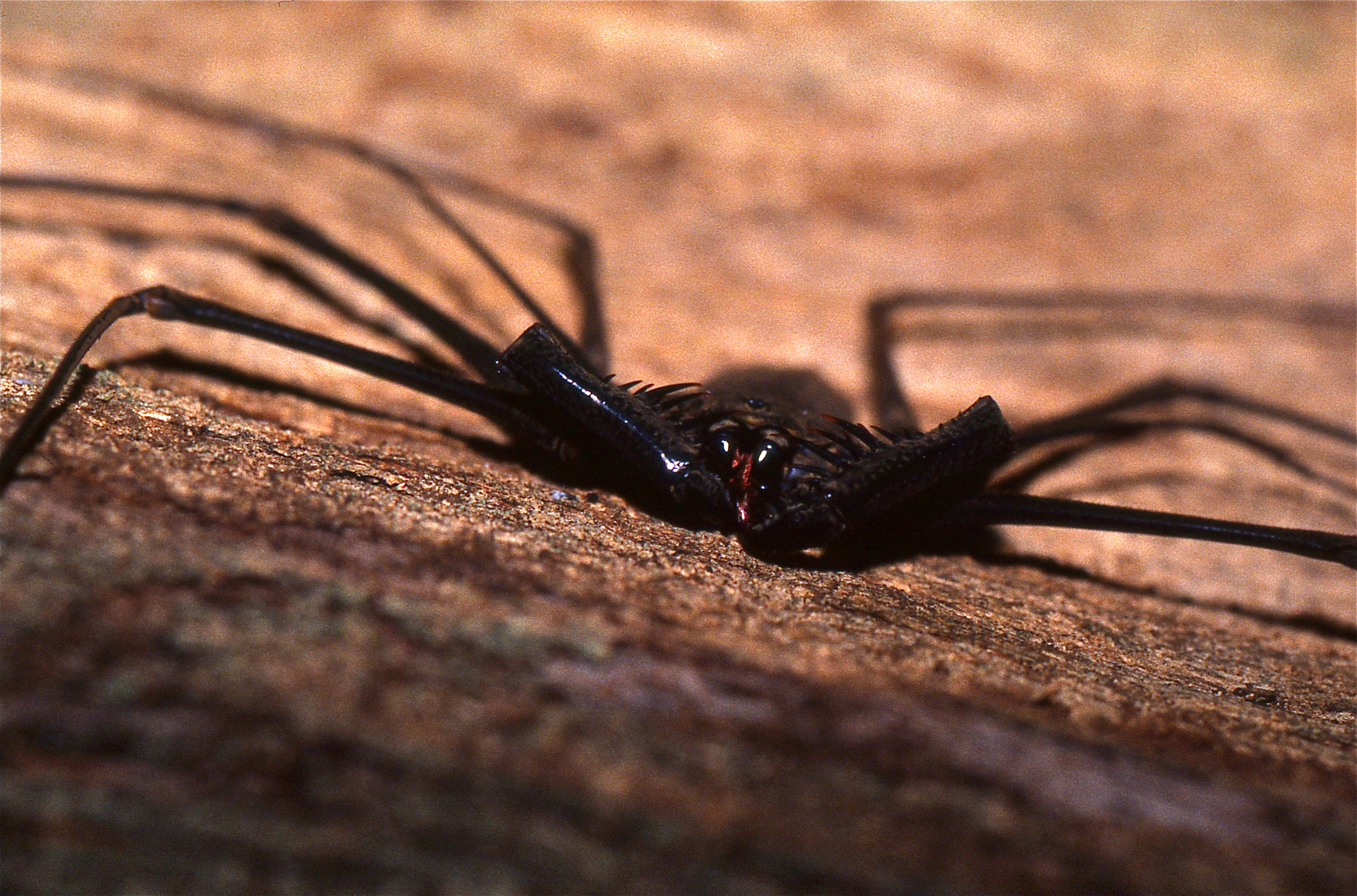
- Phrynus whitei

Scientific classification
- Kingdom: Animalia
- Phylum: Arthropoda
- Subphylum: Chelicerata
- Class: Arachnida
- Order: Amblypygi
- Family: Phrynidae
- Subfamily: Phryninae
- Genus: Phrynus; Lamarck, 1801

= Phrynus =

Phrynus Temporal range: Neogene–present

Genus of tailless whip scorpions

Phrynus is a genus of whip spiders found in tropical and subtropical regions, mostly in the new world.

== Appearance ==
Like other species of the order Amblypygi, species of the genus Phrynus are dorso-ventrally flattened arachnids with elongate, antenniform front legs used to navigate their environment and communicate with conspecifics. Individuals capture prey using raptorial pedipalps. Phrynus species vary in size, from the small Phrynus marginemaculatus to the larger Phrynus longipes. At least one species of Phrynus is territorial and cannibalistic (Phrynus longipes). Phrynus is a New World genus, found from the southern United States to northern South America; the sole known exception is Phrynus exsul from Indonesia.

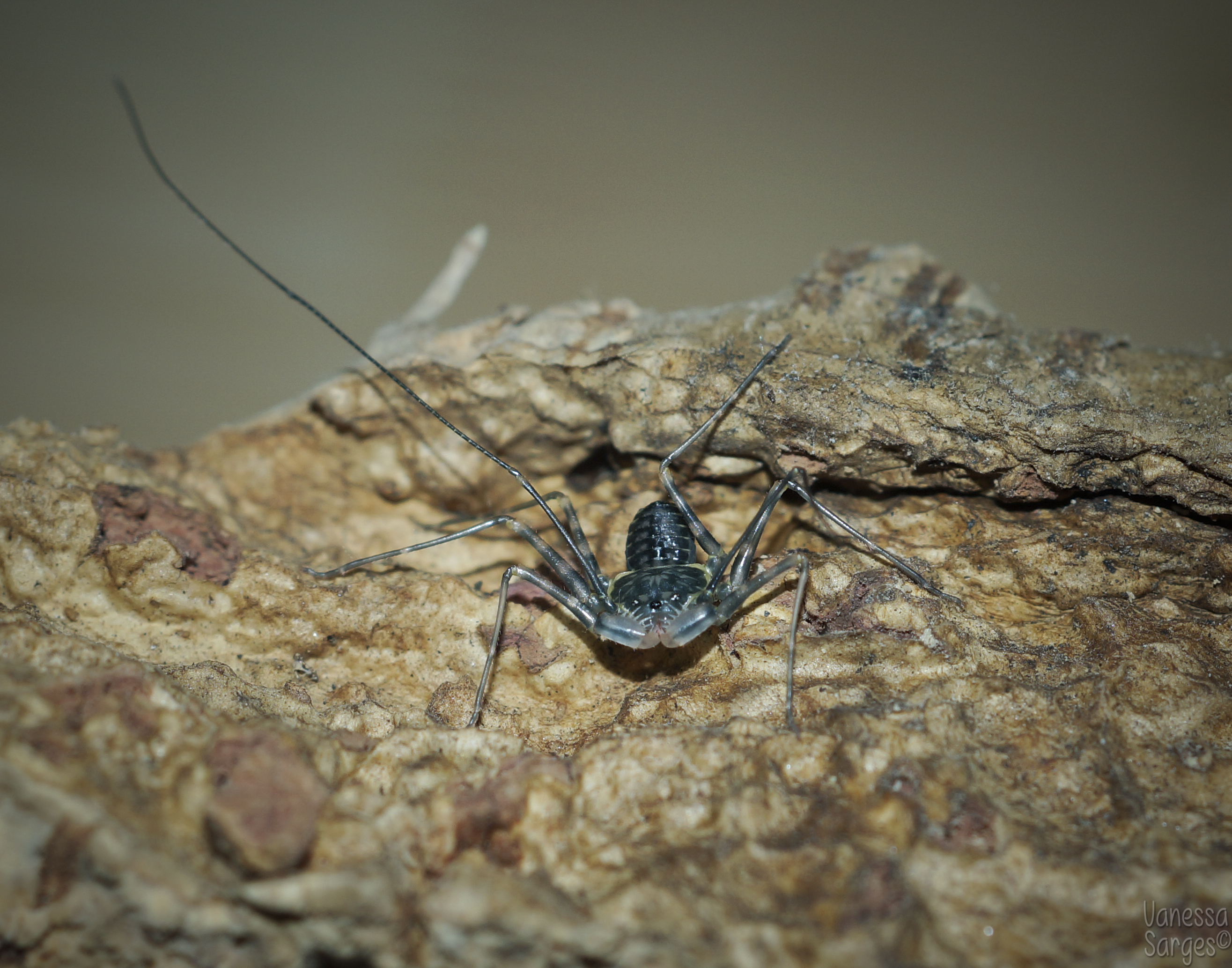
Freshly moulted Phrynus barbadensis.

== List of species ==
- Phrynus abstrusus Cazzaniga & Prendini, 2026
- Phrynus alejandroi Armas & Teruel, 2010
- Phrynus araya Colmenares Garcia & Villarreal Manzanilla 2008
- Phrynus asperatipes Wood, 1863
- Phrynus barbadensis (Pocock, 1894)
- Phrynus calypso Joya, 2017
- Phrynus cozumel Armas, 1995
- Phrynus damonidaensis Quintero, 1981
- Phrynus decoratus Teruel & Armas, 2005
- Phrynus eucharis Armas & Perez Gonzalez, 2001
- Phrynus exsul Harvey 2002
- Phrynus fuscimanus Koch, 1847
- Phrynus garridoi Armas, 1994
- Phrynus gervaisii (Pocock, 1894)
- Phrynus goesii Thorell, 1889
- Phrynus hispaniolae Armas & Perez Gonzalez, 2001
- Phrynus hoffmannae Armas & Gadar, 2004
- Phrynus kennidae Armas & Perez Gonzalez, 2001
- Phrynus levii Quintero, 1981
- Phrynus longipes (Pocock, 1894)
- Phrynus maesi Armas, 1996
- Phrynus marginemaculatus Koch, 1841
- Phrynus noeli Armas & Perez, 1994
- Phrynus operculatus Pocock, 1902
- Phrynus palenque Armas, 1995
- Phrynus panche Armas & Angarita Arias 2008
- Phrynus parvulus Pocock, 1902
- Phrynus pinarensis Franganillo, 1930
- Phrynus pinero Armas & Avila Calvo, 2000
- Phrynus pseudoparvulus Armas & Viquez, 2001
- Phrynus pulchripes (Pocock, 1894)
- Phrynus santarensis (Pocock, 1894)
- Phrynus similis Armas, Viquez & Trujillo, 2013
- Phrynus tessellatus (Pocock, 1894)
- Phrynus viridescens Franganillo, 1931
- Phrynus whitei Gervais, 1842
- †Phrynus fossilis Keferstein, 1834
- †Phrynus mexicana Poinar & Brown, 2004
- †Phrynus resinae (Schawaller, 1979)

== Original publication ==
- Lamarck, 1801 : Système des Animaux sans vertèbres, ou tableau général des classes, des ordres et des genres de ces animaux. Paris, p. 1-432.
