= Éric Ythier =

French ecotoxicologist, entomologist and arachnologist

Eric Ythier
- Ythier in the Amazon region of Ecuador, the natural habitat of Teuthraustes khodayarii and Teuthraustes giupponii.
- Born: September 30, 1978 (age 48); France
- Education: University of Tours
- Known for: Research on scorpions and the description of numerous arachnid taxa
- Scientific career
- Fields: Ecotoxicology, entomology, zoology, arachnology
- Workplaces: SynTech Research, La Chapelle-de-Guinchay, France

Eric Ythier (born 30 September 1978) is a French entomologist, zoologist, arachnologist and ecotoxicologist specializing in scorpions. He is known for his taxonomic work on scorpions and other arachnids, having described numerous species and subspecies from different parts of the world.

== Biography ==
He graduated in Entomology from the University of Tours in France. Afterwards Ythier has worked in academia and the agricultural research industry, including at Syngenta, before joining SynTech Research in 2004. He has held several scientific, managerial and commercial positions within the company, including Study Director, Global Ecotoxicology Manager and Global Sales, Marketing and Communication Director. He serves as SynTech Research's Global Lead for Product Safety and is its global technical and scientific expert for terrestrial ecotoxicology services.

== Taxa named in his honour ==
- Tityus ythieri Lourenço, 2007 (Ecuador)

== Taxa described ==
- Aegaeobuthus gallianoi Ythier, 2018 (Crete, Greece)
- Ananteris dacostai Ythier, Chevalier & Lourenço, 2020 (French Guiana)
- Ananteris duponti Ythier & Lourenço, 2026 (French Guiana)
- Ananteris inini Lourenço & Ythier, 2025 (French Guiana)
- Ananteris kalina Ythier, 2018 (French Guiana)
- Ananteris lourencoi Ythier, 2024 (Brazil)
- Ananteris mamilihpan Ythier, Chevalier & Lourenço, 2020 (French Guiana)
- Ananteris penitente Lourenço & Ythier, 2025 (Brazil)
- Ananteris pierrekondre Lourenço, Chevalier, Gangadin & Ythier, 2020 (Suriname)
- Ananteris sipilili Ythier, Chevalier & Lourenço, 2020 (French Guiana)
- Ananteris tresor Ythier, Chevalier & Lourenço, 2020 (French Guiana)
- Androctonus agrab Ythier & Lourenço, 2022 (Western Sahara)
- Androctonus ajjer Ythier, Sadine, Alioua & Lourenço, 2025 (Algeria)
- Androctonus burkinensis Ythier, 2021 (Burkina Faso)
- Androctonus maroccanus Lourenço, Ythier & Leguin, 2009 (Morocco)
- Auyantepuia aluku Ythier, 2018 (French Guiana)
- Auyantepuia aurum Ythier, 2018 (French Guiana)
- Auyantepuia kwata Ythier, Chevalier, Moreau & Murienne, 2026 (French Guiana)
- Auyantepuia laurae Ythier, 2015 (French Guiana)
- Auyantepuia manmandinan Ythier, Chevalier, Moreau & Murienne, 2026 (French Guiana)
- Auyantepuia royi Ythier, 2018 (Brazil)
- Bothriurus trifinium Lourenço, Wilmé & Ythier, 2026 (Brazil)
- Brotheas pseudogranulatus Ythier & Lourenço, 2026 (Brazil)
- Buthacus deserticus Sadine, Souilem, Lourenço & Ythier, 2024 (Algeria)
- Buthacus sadinei Ythier, 2022 (Algeria)
- Buthiscus ifoghas Ythier & Lourenço, 2023 (Mali)
- Buthus ahaggar Ythier, Sadine Haddadi & Lourenço, 2021 (Algeria)
- Buthus balmensis Ythier & Laborieux, 2022 (France)
- Buthus bobo Ythier, 2021 (Burkina Faso)
- Buthus gabani Ythier, 2021 (Portugal)
- Buthus maamora Ythier, 2023 (Morocco)
- Buthus pyrenaeus Ythier, 2021 (France)
- Buthus turkana Ythier & Lourenço, 2022 (Kenya)
- Chaerilus adrianoi Lourenço & Ythier, 2024 (Myanmar)
- Chaerilus pakistanus Lourenço & Ythier, 2025 (Pakistan)
- Chaerilus phangan Ythier, Košulič & Lourenço, 2026 (Thailand)
- Chaerilus philippinus Lourenço & Ythier, 2008 (Philippines)
- Charinus grandisterrae Ythier, Ramage, Jourdan, Giupponi & Coulis, 2023 (Guadeloupe)
- Charinus lalylaurarum Ythier & Giupponi, 2023 (French Guiana)
- Charinus marechali Ythier, Ramage, Jourdan, Giupponi & Coulis, 2023 (Martinique)
- Compsobuthus henrii Ythier & Ullrich, 2025 (Saudi Arabia)
- Compsobuthus mahazat Ythier & Lourenço, 2023 (Saudi Arabia)
- Guyanochactas flavus Lourenço & Ythier, 2011 (French Guiana)
- Guyanochactas itoupe Ythier, Chevalier & Lourenço, 2025 (French Guiana)
- Hadrurochactas cristinae Ythier, 2018 (French Guiana)
- Hadrurochactas tumucumaque Ythier & Lourenço, 2024 (French Guiana)
- Hadruroides apu Ythier, 2023 (Peru)
- Hadruroides inti Ythier, 2021 (Peru)
- Hadruroides pachamama Ythier, 2021 (Ecuador)
- Hottentotta caboverdensis Lourenço & Ythier, 2006 (Cape Verde Islands)
- Hottentotta lacroixi Ythier & Dupré, 2021 (Democratic Republic of the Congo)
- Hottentotta leetzi Ythier, 2024 (Tibet, China)
- Isometrus alessandroi Lourenço & Ythier, 2025 (Myanmar)
- Leiurus sahelicus Lourenço, El-Hennawhy & Ythier, 2025 (Niger)
- Leiurus sinai Badry, Saleh, Lourenço & Ythier, 2023 (Sinai, Egypt)
- Leiurus tamajeq Lourenço & Ythier, 2024 (Mali)
- Liocheles oranghutan Ythier & Richard, 2020 (Sumatra, Indonesia)
- Lychas chanthaburiensis Ythier & Lourenço, 2022 (Thailand)
- Lychas saiyok Lourenço & Ythier, 2026 (Thailand)
- Megachactops kurripako Ythier, 2019 (Colombia)
- Oiclus ardens Ythier, 2019 (Guadeloupe)
- Oiclus cousteaui Ythier, 2019 (Guadeloupe)
- Oiclus desirade Ythier & Ramage, 2025 (Guadeloupe)
- Oiclus tipunch Ythier, 2019 (Guadeloupe)
- Oiclus tite Ythier, Jourdan & Malglaive, 2022 (Guadeloupe)
- Opisthacanthus antongil Lourenço, Wilmé & Ythier, 2025 (Madagascar)
- Opisthacanthus lourencoi Ythier, 2022 (Madagascar)
- Opisthacanthus mossambicensis Lourenço & Ythier, 2024 (Mozambique)
- Opistophthalmus tumas Ythier, 2023 (Namibia)
- Orthochirus arabicus Ythier & Lourenço, 2023 (Saudi Arabia)
- Orthochirus arenicola Lourenço & Ythier, 2021 (Somalia)
- Pandinus sahelicus Ythier & Audibert, 2023 (Burkina Faso)
- Pseudouroplectes lalyae Lourenço & Ythier, 2010 (Madagascar)
- Sarax kosulici Ythier, 2026 (Thailand)
- Scorpio atakor Ythier, Sadine, Bengaid & Lourenço, 2024 (Algeria)
- Scorpio iznassen Ythier & François, 2023 (Morocco)
- Scorpio moulouya Ythier & François, 2023 (Morocco)
- Scorpio touili Ythier & François, 2023 (Morocco)
- Scorpiops doiphukha Ythier, Košulič, Nawanetiwong & Lourenço, 2025 (Thailand)
- Scorpiops krachan Nawanetiwong, Košulič, Warrit, Lourenço & Ythier, 2024 (Thailand)
- Scorpiops piceus Lourenço & Ythier, 2022 (Laos)
- Scorpiops zhangshuyuani Ythier, 2019 (China)
- Spinochactas camopi Lourenço, Chevalier & Ythier, 2022 (French Guiana)
- Teuthraustes giupponii Ythier & Lourenço, 2017 (Ecuador)
- Teuthraustes japura Lourenço & Ythier, 2022 (Brazil)
- Teuthraustes khodayarii Ythier & Lourenço, 2017 (Ecuador)
- Teuthraustes kuryi Ythier & Lourenço, 2017 (Ecuador)
- Tityus cisandinus Ythier & Lourenço, 2017 (Ecuador)
- Tityus crassicauda Lourenço & Ythier, 2013 (Ecuador)
- Tityus kukututee Ythier, Chevalier & Gangadin, 2020 (Suriname)
- Uroplectes nigrimanus maore Lourenço, Wilmé & Ythier, 2025 (Mayotte)

== Books ==
- Scorpions of the World. 2010. N.A.P. Éditions, France. 567 pp.
