= Phrynus garridoi =

Scientific classification
- Kingdom: Animalia
- Phylum: Arthropoda
- Subphylum: Chelicerata
- Class: Arachnida
- Order: Amblypygi
- Family: Phrynidae
- Genus: Phrynus
- Species: P. garridoi

Binomial name
- Phrynus garridoi Armas, 1994

Species of whip-spider

Phrynus garridoi is a species of Amblypygi in the family of Phrynidae.

== Distribution ==
The species is endemic to Guerrero in Mexico. It is also found in Acapulco and Tierra Colorada.

== Description ==
The males measure 17.50 to 21.30 millimetres (0.839 in) and the females from 16.00 to 21.00 millimetres (0.827 in).

== Etymology ==
The species is named in honour of Orlando H. Garrido.

== Original publication ==
- Armas, 1994 : Nueva especie de Phrynus (Amblypygi: Phrynidae) del estado de Guerrero, México. AvaCient, vol. 9, p. 34-37.
