= Catageus =

Scientific classification
- Kingdom: Animalia
- Phylum: Arthropoda
- Subphylum: Chelicerata
- Class: Arachnida
- Order: Amblypygi
- Family: Charontidae
- Genus: Catageus; Thorell, 1889

Type species
- Catageus pusillus Thorell, 1889

Species
- 9, see text

Synonyms
- Stygophrynus Kraepelin, 1895

Genus of whip scorpions

Catageus is a genus of amblypygids of the family Charontidae.

== Species ==
As of October 2022, there are 8 species in this genus.

- Catageus berkeleyi (Graveley, 1915)
- Catageus brevispina (Weygoldt, 2002)
- Catageus cavernicola (Thorell, 1889)
- Catageus cerberus (Simon, 1901)
- Catageus dammermani (Roewer, 1928)
- Catageus longispina (Gravely, 1915)
- Catageus orientalis (Seiter & Wolf, 2017)
- Catageus sunda (Rahmadi & Harvey, 2008)
