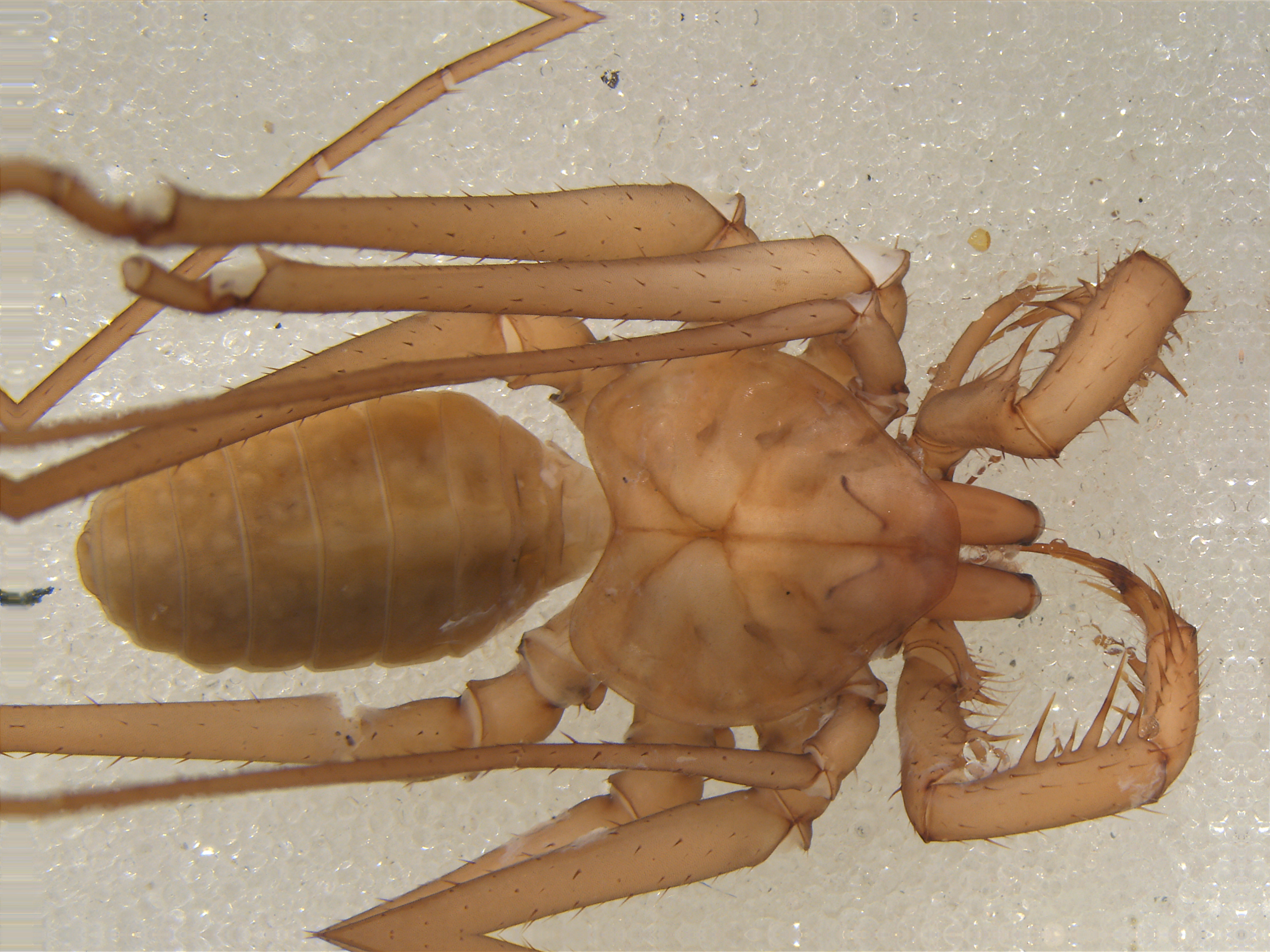

Scientific classification
- Kingdom: Animalia
- Phylum: Arthropoda
- Subphylum: Chelicerata
- Class: Arachnida
- Order: Amblypygi
- Family: Paracharontidae
- Genus: Jorottui; Moreno-González et al, 2023
- Species: J. ipuanai

Binomial name
- Jorottui ipuanai Moreno-González et al, 2023

= Jorottui =

Genus of arachnid

Jorottui is a genus of whipspider containing a single species, Jorottui ipuanai. It is endemic to Colombia, being first collected from caves in the Upper Camarones river basin. It is one of two genera within the family Paracharontidae, the other being Paracharon from Guinea-Bissau in West Africa. J. ipuanai is troglobitic, living only in caves and lacking eyes. Like Paracharon, the pedipalps of Jorottui fold vertically upwards, rather than horizontally in front of the body. It was described in 2023.

The discovery of Jorottui, the first and only extant Paleoamblypygid collected since the last collection of Paracharon caecus in 1899, enabled the development of the first molecular phylogenetic tree of the amblypygi. This study confirmed the placement of the Paracharontidae as the sister group to all other amblypygi, found Charinidae to be a junior synonym of Charontidae, and uncovered other non-monophylies within the Euamblypygi.
