= Kleines Berlin =

Complex of air-raid tunnels in Italy

Coordinates: 45°39′20″N 13°46′41″E

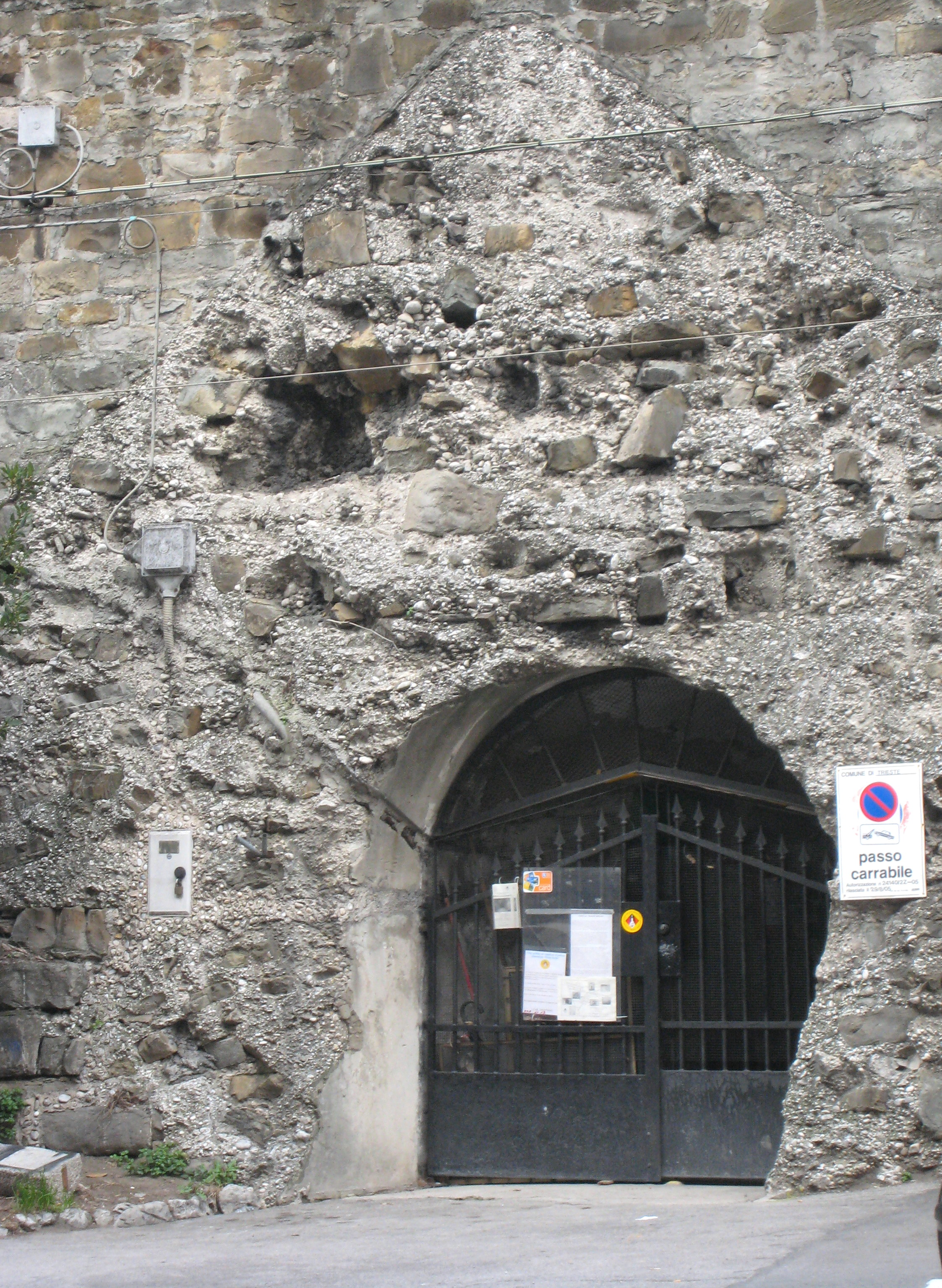
The entrance

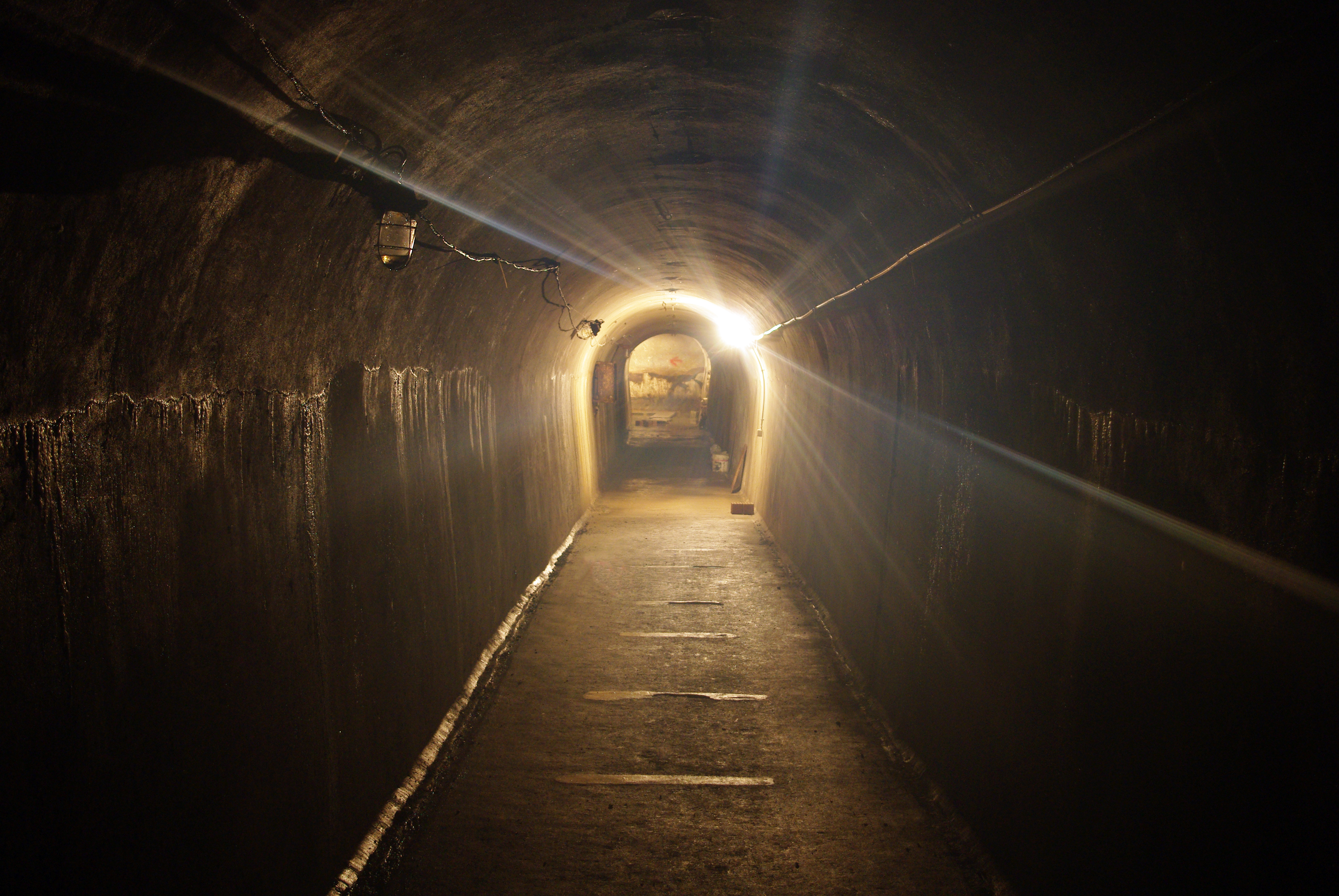
One of the tunnels

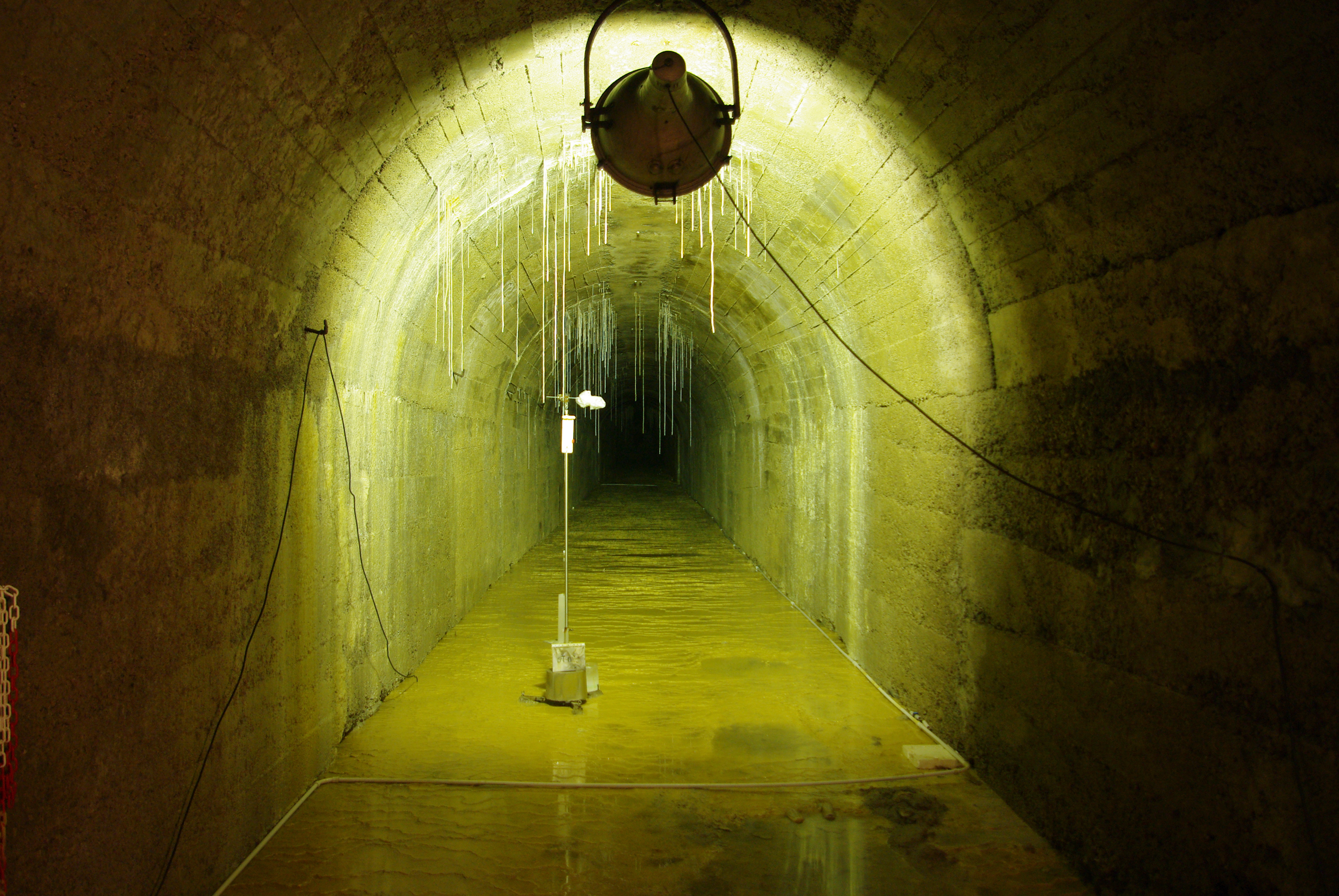
Tunnel with stalactites

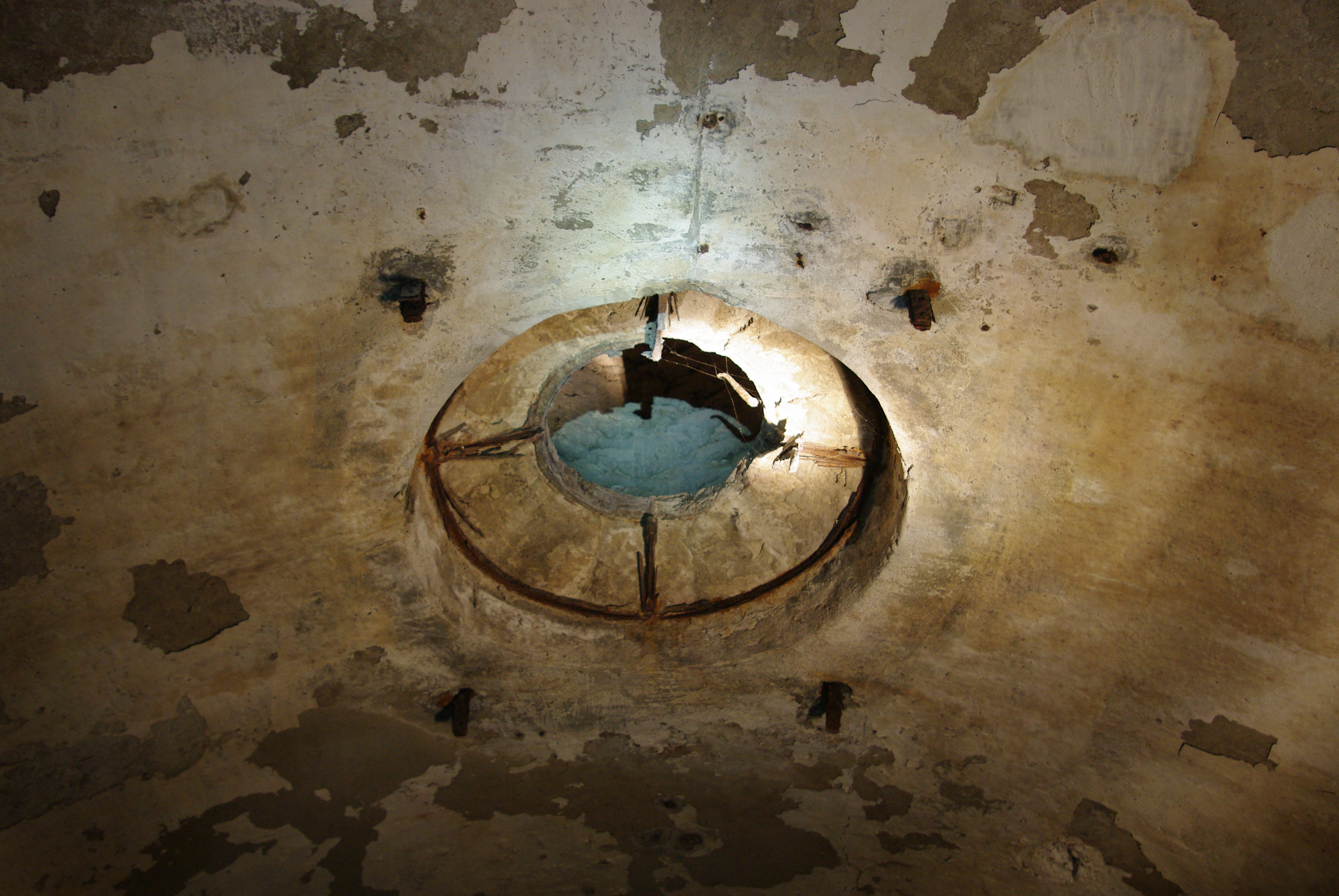
Ventilation

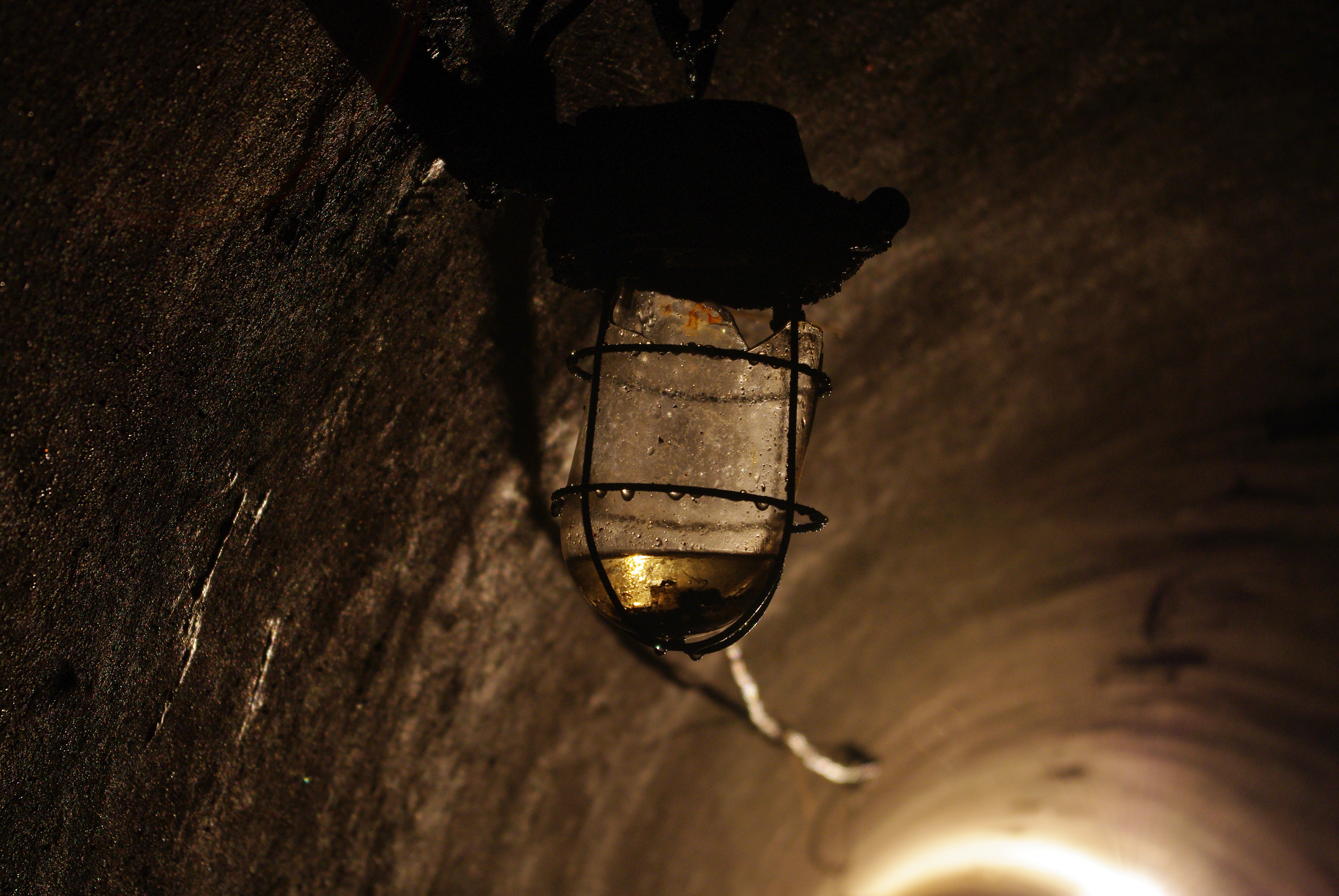
Wall-mounted illumination

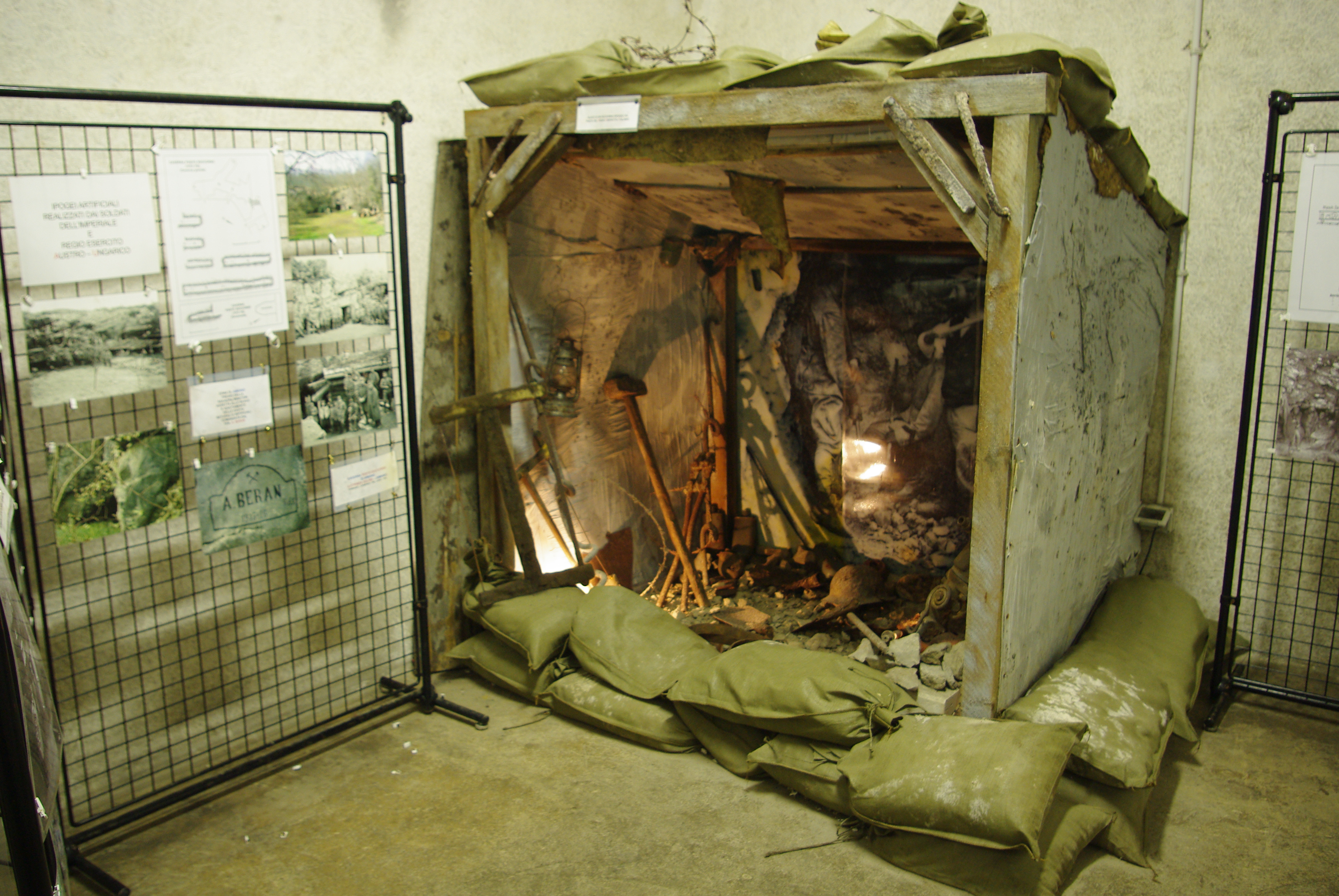
Exposition in one of the rooms

Kleines Berlin (lit. 'Little Berlin' in German) is the complex of underground air-raid tunnels dating to World War II, which still exists in Trieste, Italy.

== History ==
After annexing Trieste into the "Adriatic Coast Operational Zone" in 1943, the Germans started to build a large number of military defenses.

The work was carried out by companies cooperating with the Organisation Todt. In particular, the German authorities wanted to build an antiaircraft shelter for their soldiers and civil employees operating in the Trieste Court area.

The creation of the shelter was not the utmost importance, because when the air-raid alarm went off, German soldiers would flee with Italian civilians into a "municipal" shelter tunnel, which was on the stocks. To that end, the Nazi authorities had supplied the lighting installation for the municipal tunnel. As a result, the "municipal" tunnel was equipped with an electric system made up of bare copper wires - according to German use - instead of bare lead wires, like those employed in other antiaircraft tunnels of Trieste.

== Excavation ==
The excavation of the shelter involved three different companies, each working independently from one another. SS-Gruppenführer Odilo Globočnik, the SS and Police Leader for the city, had ordered them to work in secrecy, because he had thought of creating a "secret passage" between his house and a court. The shelter's entrance at via Fabio Severo (close to the street leading to via di Romagna), as well as the passage leading to the Court of Trieste, were built by land-surveyor Gerdol's company, which worked on behalf of Organisation Todt.

== Structure ==
The underground complex is divided into two sectors, one of Italian construction and one of German construction, that are structurally different from each other.

The Italian sector consists of a series of parallel tunnels connected by other perpendiculars, the better equipped with wooden benches, a first aid room and a toilet facilities. It is served by three entrances, all on via Fabio Severo.

The German sector, however, consists of a set of big rooms perpendicular to a long main tunnel. It covers an area of 1,000 square meters. It had been occupied exclusively by SS troops, partly because it was used by Globočnik to reach, from his home, offices located in the Court of Trieste, without going out into the open. It had a total of four entrances: one in the garden of the villa above Ara (home of Globočnik), one in the basement of the courthouse, and two, including the main experiment, via Fabio Severo.

Use of the entrance to the German sector was forbidden to any non-German staff. No Italian was allowed to enter it, except for an electrician working for the Luigi Presel company, in charge of replacing burnt out lamps.

The Germans' main concern for the management of the shelter was the high amount of humidity stagnating the tunnels. They used braziers burning coke coal in order to dry up the rooms. However, burnt gas was conveyed through an expelling fan to the "municipal" tunnel, causing serious problems of asphyxia for the people sheltered there.

== Last days of war ==
In the night of 29 April 1945, Gauleiter and Reich Defense Commissioner Friedrich Rainer together with Globočnik abandoned Trieste and fled to Austria. There, they were arrested by the Allies. On 30 April 1945 an insurrection broke out in Trieste led by the Italian anti-Fascist National Liberation Committee (Comitato di Liberazione Nazionale, or CLN).

On 1 May 1945, Yugoslav Partisan troops entered the city, surrounding the last German strongholds and forcing German soldiers to surrender. The Court, connected by the tunnels to the antiaircraft shelter, was among these strongholds. No trace of a Yugoslav attempt to penetrate the corridor of the Court has been found; the passage's existence was likely unknown to them. The fight for the City did not last long. German soldiers surrendered to New Zealand troops, which in the meantime had entered the city. After twenty months, the German occupation of Trieste had come to an end.
