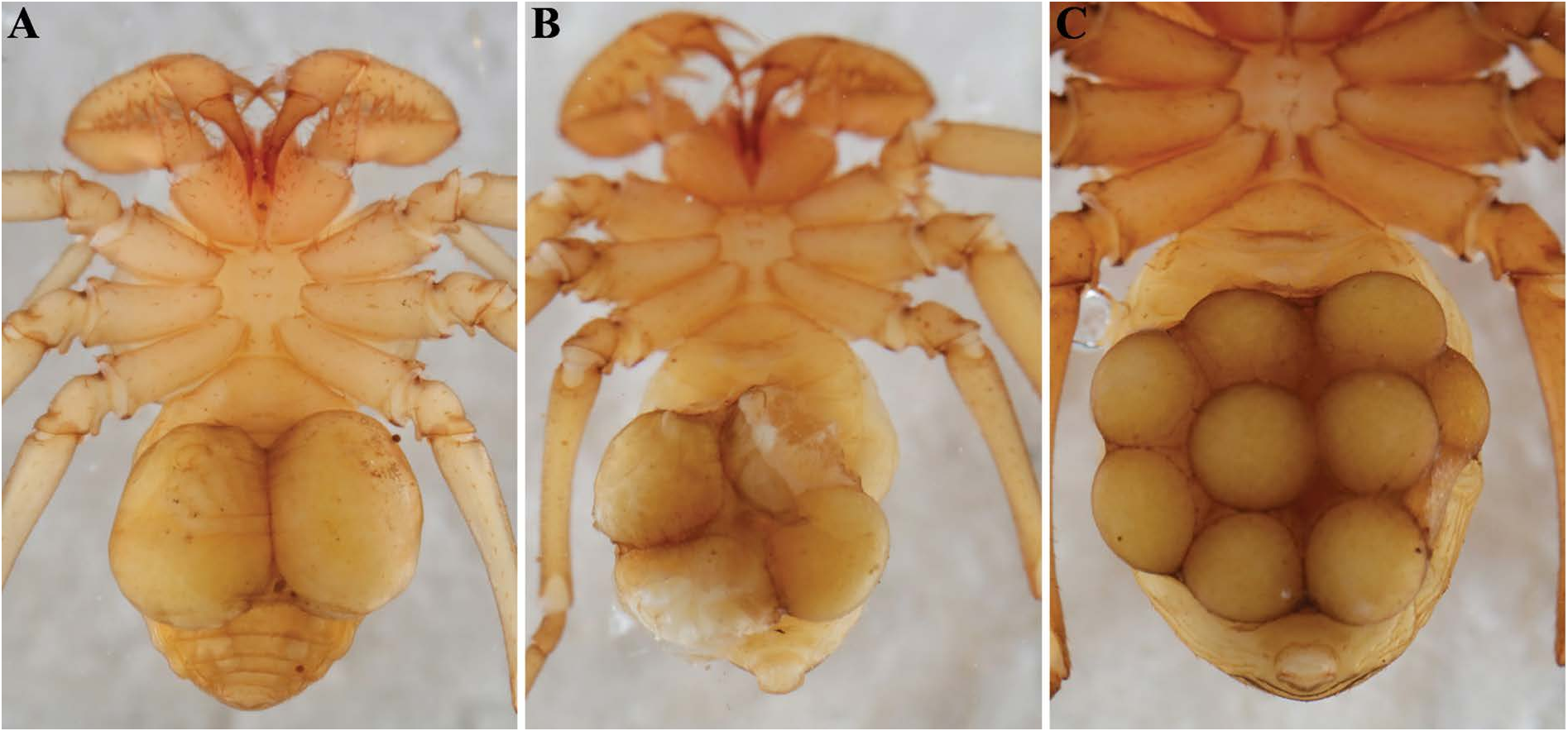
- Sarax ioanniticus, ♀♀, at different developmental stages carrying egg sacs.

Scientific classification
- Kingdom: Animalia
- Phylum: Arthropoda
- Subphylum: Chelicerata
- Class: Arachnida
- Order: Amblypygi
- Family: Charinidae
- Genus: Sarax; Simon, 1892

= Sarax =

Genus of tailless whip scorpions

Sarax is a genus of amblypygids of the family Charinidae.

== Species ==
There are 41 species accepted in this genus:

- Sarax abbatei (Delle Cave, 1986)
- Sarax batuensis Roewer, 1962
- Sarax bengalensis (Gravely, 1911)
- Sarax bilua Miranda, Giupponi, Prendini and Scharff, 2021
- Sarax bispinosus (Nair, 1934)
- Sarax brachydactylus Simon, 1892
- Sarax cavernicola Rahmadi, Harvey and Kojima, 2010
- Sarax cochinensis (Gravely, 1915)
- Sarax cochinensis cochinensis (Gravely, 1915)
- Sarax curioi Giupponi and Miranda, 2012
- Sarax dhofarensis (Weygoldt, Pohl and Polak, 2002)
- Sarax dunni Miranda, Giupponi, Prendini and Scharff, 2021
- Sarax gravelyi Miranda, Giupponi, Prendini and Scharff, 2021
- Sarax huberi Seiter, Wolff and Hörweg, 2015
- Sarax indochinensis Miranda, Giupponi, Prendini and Scharff, 2021
- Sarax ioanniticus (Kritscher, 1959)
- Sarax israelensis (Miranda, Aharon, Gavish-Regev, Giupponi and Wizen, 2016)
- Sarax javensis (Gravely, 1915)
- Sarax kosulici Ythier, 2026
- Sarax lembeh Miranda, Giupponi, Prendini and Scharff, 2021
- Sarax mardua Rahmadi, Harvey and Kojima, 2010
- Sarax monodenticulatus Rahmadi and Kojima, 2010
- Sarax newbritainensis Rahmadi and Kojima, 2010
- Sarax omanensis (Delle Cave, Gardner and Weygoldt, 2009)
- Sarax pakistanus (Weygoldt, 2005)
- Sarax palau Miranda, Giupponi, Prendini and Scharff, 2021
- Sarax quinquespinus Xu, Gong & Zhang, 2026
- Sarax rahmadii Miranda, Giupponi, Prendini and Scharff, 2021
- Sarax rimosus (Simon, 1901)
- Sarax sangkulirangensis Rahmadi, Harvey and Kojima, 2010
- Sarax sarawakensis (Thorell, 1888)
- Sarax seychellarum (Kraepelin, 1898)
- Sarax sinensis Wu, Zhu, Liu, de Miranda, Román-Palacios, Li and He, 2022
- Sarax singaporae Gravely, 1911
- Sarax socotranus (Weygoldt, Pohl and Polak, 2002)
- Sarax stygochthobius (Weygoldt and Van Damme, 2004)
- Sarax timorensis Miranda and Reboleira, 2019
- Sarax tiomanensis Miranda, Giupponi, Prendini and Scharff, 2021
- Sarax willeyi Gravely, 1915
- Sarax yayukae Rahmadi, Harvey and Kojima, 2010
- Sarax yunnan Xu, Yu & Zhang, 2025
