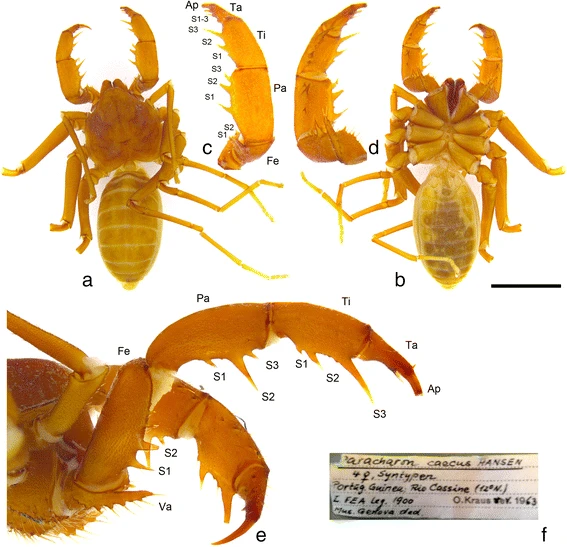
- Paracharon caecus

Scientific classification
- Kingdom: Animalia
- Phylum: Arthropoda
- Subphylum: Chelicerata
- Class: Arachnida
- Order: Amblypygi
- Suborder: Paleoamblypygi
- Family: Paracharontidae; Weygoldt, 1996

Genera
- Paracharon; Jorottui

= Paracharontidae =

Family of arachnids

Paracharontidae is an arachnid family within the order Amblypygi (tailless whip scorpions). Paracharontidae and the extinct Weygoldtinidae from the Carboniferous form the suborder Paleoamblypygi, one of the two suborders within Amblypygi. The family contains two genera: Paracharon, containing the single species Paracharon caecus from Guinea-Bissau in West Africa, and Jorottui, with the single species Jorottui ipuanai from Colombia in northern South America. Paracharonopsis from the Eocene (Ypresian) aged Cambay amber of India was initially assigned to this family, but this was later questioned, and it has since been reassigned to Euamblypygi. Both living species are troglobites, having no eyes; P. caecus lives in termite nests while J. ipuanai inhabits caves.
