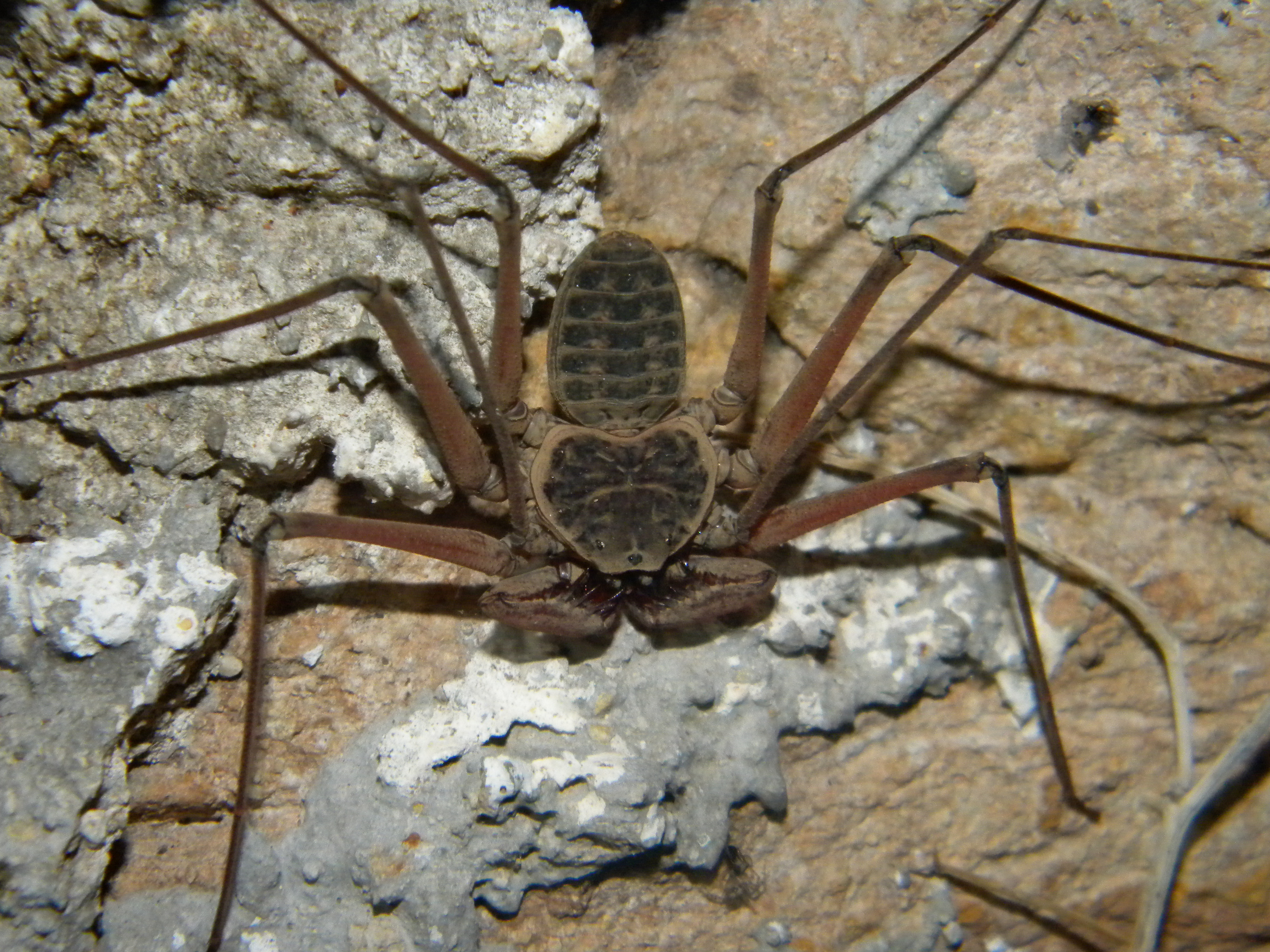

Scientific classification
- Kingdom: Animalia
- Phylum: Arthropoda
- Subphylum: Chelicerata
- Class: Arachnida
- Order: Amblypygi
- Family: Phrynidae
- Genus: Phrynus
- Species: P. longipes

Binomial name
- Phrynus longipes (Pocock, 1894)

= Phrynus longipes =

Species of amblypygid

Phrynus longipes is a species of amblypygid (also referred to as whipspiders or tailless whipscorpions) native to the Caribbean region. They are protective of their territory, using their pedipalps to deter predators or unwanted visitors. Being nocturnal predators, they take shelter during the day and hunt primarily at night. Phrynus longipes feeds on primarily arthropods, but has been observed to prey upon small vertebrates.

== Description ==
The body of Phrynus longipes rarely exceeds three quarters of an inch. The front legs have been recorded at sizes of almost ten inches long. They have two sets of four legs – like almost all arachnids. However, only the last six legs are used for walking while the first two are employed as sensors. Phrynus longipes, like all amblypygids, produce no venom or silk.

Phrynus longipes, similar to many other amblypygid species, exhibits sexual dimorphism, using sexually dimorphic pedipalps for territorial display and combat.

== Distribution and habitat ==
=== Distribution ===
Phrynus longipes occurs in a number of localities throughout the Caribbean, with the male holotype being from Haiti. They have a preference for warm and wet climates. Phrynus longipes are typically found in the forests of Central America and the northernmost point of South America.

=== Habitat ===
Phrynus longipes is found in wet subtropical forest. Different homes (such as caves, trees, and shrubs) provide different evolutionary advantages and disadvantages. Despite their ability and willingness to live in a wide variety of homes, Phrynus longipes has been shown to prefer to live near or in massive tree stumps. It is believed this is the case as most of the prey for this specific species also tends to gather around large tree stumps.

== Diet ==
Phrynus longipes are primarily nocturnal, and are considered ambush predators. They feed mostly on small insects and other arthropods as their primary source of food, but occasionally prey upon small vertebrates such as lizards and frogs. Cave populations primarily prey on cockroaches. One Phrynus longipes was recorded feeding on a hummingbird in the British Virgin Islands. This specific example was the first recorded instance of a bird being preyed upon by an amblypygid.

== Mating and reproduction ==
The length of a sexual interaction between Phrynus longipes varies - it can be as short as one hour but as long as eight hours. They mate via indirect sperm transfer utilizing a sclerotizied spermatophore. Pre-mating behavior is highly conserved and oftentimes performed by the male as he tries to court the female. These behaviors include jerking motions and pedipalp movements. Following these interactions, the spermatophore will be deposited into the female - ultimately resulting in fertilization and the development of an egg sac.

Polygyny is the most common mating pattern amongst Phrynus longipes as the males are free to mate with many females. The females, due to their caring for the egg sac, are prohibited from mating freely with multiple males. In the cases where polygyny does not occur, Phrynus longipes has been observed to take part in mate-multiply behavior. This means that one male will mate multiple times with the same female in order to ensure full paternal-ship of every clutch. This type of monogamous mating better ensures that the male will have plentiful offspring of his own.

== Social behavior ==
Phrynus longipes have not been observed displaying prosocial behaviors. Rather, the majority of their social behavior comes in the form of agonistic interactions over territory. They have been shown to choose around half of a square meter of land and protect it. Aside from this behavior, they exhibit minimal protective behavior and social interaction.

Phrynus longipes exhibits defense mechanisms for their territory. These behaviors are often highly conserved and can often follow unique patterns of repeated behaviors. Further, competition among Phrynus longipes is a common occurrence.

They often initiate disputes with a series of pedipalp movements. If the dispute is not resolved then physical violence ensues. Some fights end with the two opponents walking away unscathed, while others result in the loser being consumed by the winner.

== Predators ==
Amblypygi including Phrynus species have been recorded as being preyed upon by reptiles and mammals, as well as other arachnids. However, cave populations of Phrynus longipes tend to be the dominant predator in their ecosystem. In territorial conflicts, Phrynus longipes have been shown to kill and eat each other.
