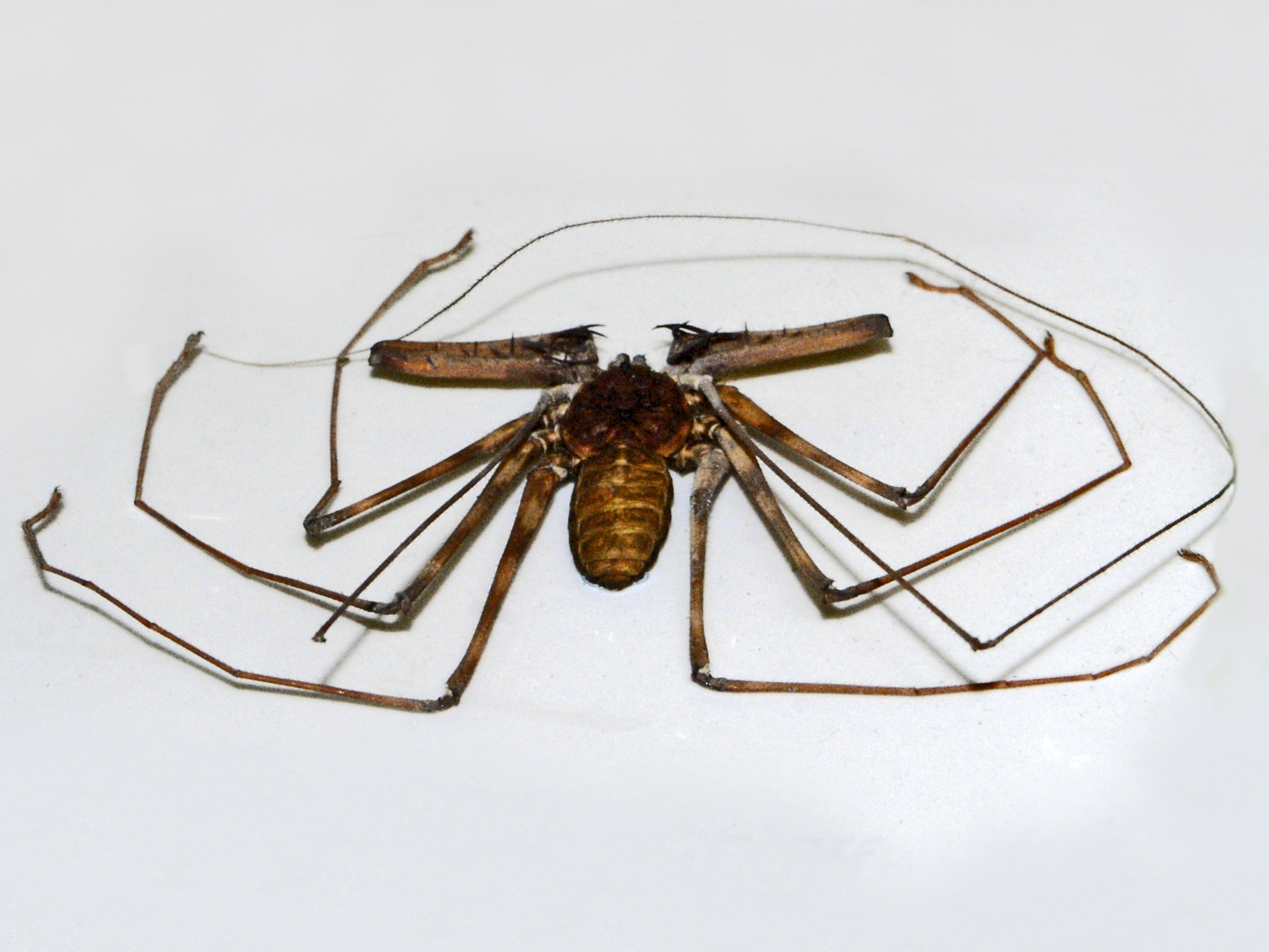
- Charon grayi from Sulawesi on display at the Museo Civico di Storia Naturale di Milano

Scientific classification
- Kingdom: Animalia
- Phylum: Arthropoda
- Subphylum: Chelicerata
- Class: Arachnida
- Order: Amblypygi
- Family: Charontidae; Simon, 1892
- Genus: Charon; Karsch, 1879

Species
- 7, see text

= Charon (arachnid) =

Genus of arachnid

Charon is a genus of whipspiders from Asia and Australasia, first described by Ferdinand Karsch in 1879.

== Species ==
As of August 2023, the World Amblypygi Catalog accepted the following seven species:

- Charon dantei Réveillion & Maquart, 2018 — La Réunion
- Charon ambreae Réveillion & Maquart, 2018 — Taiwan
- Charon forsteri (Dunn, 1949) — Solomon Islands
- Charon gervaisi Harvey & West, 1998 — Christmas Island
- Charon grayi (Gervais, 1842) — Southeast Asia
- Charon oenpelli Harvey & West, 1998 — Australia
- Charon trebax Harvey & West, 1998 — Australia
