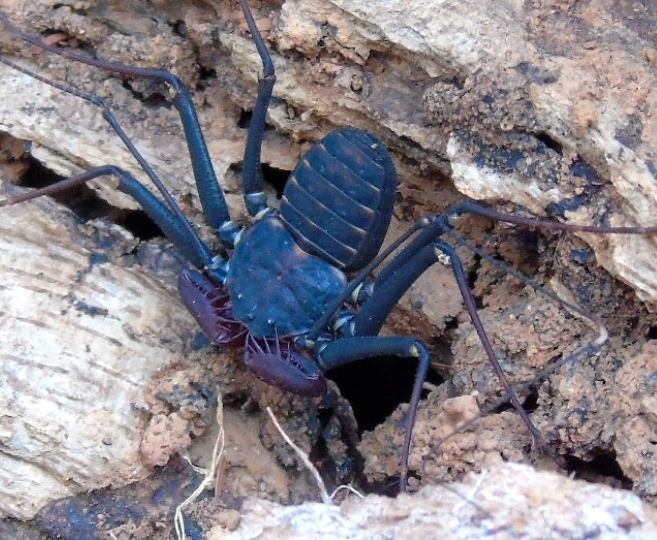

Scientific classification
- Kingdom: Animalia
- Phylum: Arthropoda
- Subphylum: Chelicerata
- Class: Arachnida
- Order: Amblypygi
- Family: Phrynidae
- Genus: Phrynus
- Species: P. operculatus

Binomial name
- Phrynus operculatus Pocock, 1902

= Phrynus operculatus =

Species of tailless whip scorpion

Phrynus operculatus is a species of tailless whipscorpion in the family Phrynidae.

== Description ==
This species is of medium size, measuring 18–22 mm in total length. It is of chestnut color, slightly reddish on the carapace and the pedipalps; the front area is moderately narrow, with the front edge gently bilobed. The basal segment of the chelicerae has an external tooth. Pedipalps have four anterior spines in the trochanter. In the female, the gonopods appear with the sclerite relatively short, wide in the base and with the apex narrow and curved towards the ventral surface.

== Distribution ==
This species is found in Mexico in the states of Nuevo León, Sinaloa, Nayarit, Jalisco, Guanajuato, Colima, Michoacán, Guerrero, Morelos, Oaxaca and Chiapas. A population in Texas is now considered a new species, Phrynus abstrusus, based on separation from the Mexican population and several physical differences.

== Habitat ==
This species, having a wide distribution, seems to have great ecological plasticity. It has been found under stones, under semi-shed tree bark, and under dry cacti in xerophilous forests.
