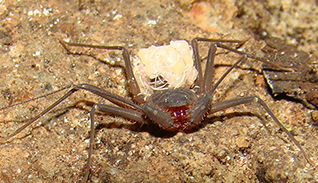

Scientific classification
- Kingdom: Animalia
- Phylum: Arthropoda
- Subphylum: Chelicerata
- Class: Arachnida
- Order: Amblypygi
- Family: Charinidae
- Genus: Charinus; Simon, 1892

Type species
- Charinus australianus (L. Koch)

Synonyms
- Charinides Gravely, 1911; Enantiosarax Mello-Leitão, 1931; Oligacanthophrynus Caporiacco, 1947; Lindosiella Kritscher, 1959; Speleophrynus Ravelo, 1975; Tricharinus Quintero, 1986

= Charinus =

Genus of whip-spiders

Charinus is a genus of amblypygids (whip-spiders) of the family Charinidae.

== Species ==
As of October 2022, the genus comprised 107 species:

- Charinus abbatei Delle Cave, 1986
- Charinus acaraje Pinto-da-Rocha, Machado & Weygoldt, 2002
- Charinus acosta (Quintero, 1983)
- Charinus africanus Hansen, 1921
- Charinus aguayoi Moyá-Guzmán, 2009
- Charinus alagoanus Miranda, Giupponi, Prendini & Scharff, 2021
- Charinus apiaca Miranda, Giupponi, Prendini & Scharff, 2021
- Charinus asturius Pinto-da-Rocha, Machado & Weygoldt, 2002
- Charinus australianus (L. Koch, 1867)
- Charinus belizensis Miranda, Giupponi & Wizen, 2016
- Charinus bengalensis (Gravely, 1911)
- Charinus bichuetteae Giupponi & Miranda, 2016
- Charinus bonaldoi Giupponi & Miranda, 2016
- Charinus bordoni (Ravelo, 1975)
- Charinus brasilianus Weygoldt, 1972
- Charinus brescoviti Giupponi & Miranda, 2016
- Charinus bromeliaea Joque & Giupponi, 2012
- Charinus bruneti Teruel & Questel, 2011
- Charinus camachoi (González-Sponga, 1998)
- Charinus carajas Giupponi & Miranda, 2016
- Charinus caribensis (Quintero, 1986)
- Charinus carinae Miranda, Giupponi, Prendini & Scharff, 2021
- Charinus carioca Miranda, Giupponi, Prendini & Scharff, 2021
- Charinus carvalhoi Miranda, Giupponi, Prendini & Scharff, 2021
- Charinus cavernicolus Weygoldt, 2006
- Charinus cearensis Miranda, Giupponi, Prendini & Scharff, 2021
- Charinus centralis Armas & Ávila Calvo, 2000
- Charinus cubensis (Quintero, 1983)
- Charinus decu (Quintero, 1983)
- Charinus dhofarensis Weygoldt, Pohl & Polak, 2002
- Charinus diamantinus Miranda, Giupponi, Prendini & Scharff, 2021
- Charinus dominicanus Armas & González, 2002
- Charinus eleonorae Baptista & Giupponi, 2003
- Charinus elegans Weygoldt, 2006
- Charinus euclidesi Miranda, Giupponi, Prendini & Scharff, 2021
- Charinus fagei Weygoldt, 1972
- Charinus gertschi Goodnight & Goodnight, 1946
- Charinus goitaca Miranda, Giupponi, Prendini & Scharff, 2021
- Charinus guayaquil Miranda, Giupponi, Prendini & Scharff, 2021
- Charinus guto Giupponi & Miranda, 2016
- Charinus imperialis Miranda, Giupponi, Prendini & Scharff, 2021
- Charinus insularis Banks, 1902
- Charinus jibaossu Vasconcelos, Giupponi & Ferreira, 2014
- Charinus koepckei Weygoldt, 1972
- Charinus loko Miranda, Giupponi, Prendini & Scharff, 2021
- Charinus longipes Weygoldt, 2006
- Charinus madagascariensis Fage, 1954
- Charinus magalhaesi Miranda, Giupponi, Prendini & Scharff, 2021
- Charinus milloti Fage, 1939
- Charinus miskito Miranda, Giupponi, Prendini & Scharff, 2021
- Charinus mocoa Miranda, Giupponi, Prendini & Scharff, 2021
- Charinus monasticus Miranda, Giupponi, Prendini & Scharff, 2021
- Charinus montanus Weygoldt, 1972
- Charinus muchmorei Armas & Teruel, 1997
- Charinus mysticus Giupponi & Kury, 2002
- Charinus neocaledonicus Simon, 1895
- Charinus omanensis Delle Cave, Gardner & Weygoldt, 2009
- Charinus orientalis Giupponi & Miranda, 2016
- Charinus pakistanus Weygoldt, 2005
- Charinus palikur Miranda, Giupponi, Prendini & Scharff, 2021
- Charinus papuanus Weygoldt, 2006
- Charinus pardillalensis (González-Sponga, 1998)
- Charinus pecki Weygoldt, 2006
- Charinus perezassoi Armas, 2010
- Charinus perquerens Miranda, Giupponi, Prendini & Scharff, 2021
- Charinus pescotti Dunn, 1949
- Charinus platnicki (Quintero, 1986)
- Charinus potiguar Vasconcelos, Giupponi & Ferreira, 2013
- Charinus puri Miranda, Giupponi, Prendini & Scharff, 2021
- Charinus quinteroi Weygoldt, 2002
- Charinus reddelli Miranda, Giupponi & Wizen, 2016
- Charinus renneri Miranda, Giupponi & Wizen, 2016
- Charinus santandereanus Villareal et al., 2025
- Charinus schirchii (Mello-Leitão, 1931)
- Charinus seychellarum Kraepelin, 1898
- Charinus sillami Réveillion & Maquart, 2015
- Charinus socotranus Weygoldt, Pohl & Polak, 2002
- Charinus sooretama Miranda, Giupponi, Prendini & Scharff, 2021
- Charinus souzai Miranda, Giupponi, Prendini & Scharff, 2021
- Charinus stygochthobius Weygoldt & Van Damme, 2004
- Charinus susuwa MMiranda, Giupponi, Prendini & Scharff, 2021
- Charinus taboa Vasconcelos, Giupponi & Ferreira, 2016
- Charinus tomasmicheli Armas, 2007
- Charinus troglobius Baptista & Giupponi, 2002
- Charinus tronchonii (Ravelo, 1975)
- Charinus ruschii Miranda, Giupponi & Wizen, 2016
- Charinus una Miranda, Giupponi, Prendini & Scharff, 2021
- Charinus vulgaris Miranda & Giupponi, 2011
- Charinus wanlessi Simon, 1892
