= Territory (disambiguation) =

A territory is a subdivision of a country having a legal status different from other regions of that country.

Territory may also refer to:

- Box office territory
- Sales territory
- Territoriality (nonverbal communication), how people use space to communicate ownership/occupancy of areas and possessions

== Music ==
- Territory (Ronnie Montrose album), 1986
- Territory (Alvin Youngblood Hart album), 1998
- "Territory" (song), a 1993 song by Sepultura
- Territory (Two Hours Traffic album), 2009

== Film and television ==
- Territory (1978 film), a 1978 Soviet film
- Territory (2015 film), a 2015 Russian film
- The Territory (1981 film), a Portuguese film
- The Territory (2022 film), an American film
- Territory (2023 film), a 2023 Indian Marathi-language thriller film
- Territory (TV series), a 2024 Australian drama series

== Other uses ==
- Ford Territory (Australia), a crossover SUV built by Ford Australia
- Ford Territory (China), a crossover SUV built by JMC-Ford
- Spraying (animal behavior) (territorial marking)
- Territory (animal), a geographical area defended by an animal against others of the same species (and occasionally of other species)
- Territory (novel), a 2007 novel by Emma Bull

== See also ==
- Territorial Army (disambiguation), the name for the Army Reserve in the United Kingdom until 2013, and in some Commonwealth nations
- Territorial tax systems (vs. residency based or hybrid)
