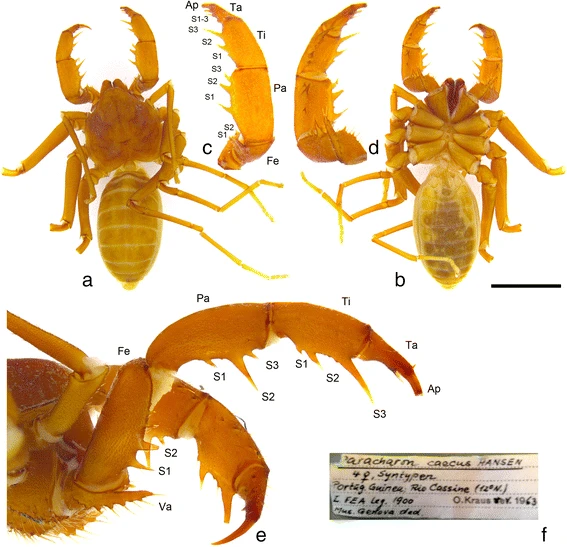
- P. caecus

Scientific classification
- Kingdom: Animalia
- Phylum: Arthropoda
- Subphylum: Chelicerata
- Class: Arachnida
- Order: Amblypygi
- Family: Paracharontidae
- Genus: Paracharon; Hansen, 1921
- Species: P. caecus

Binomial name
- Paracharon caecus Hansen, 1921

= Paracharon =

Genus of amblypygi

Paracharon is a genus of tailless whip scorpion. A single species, Paracharon caecus, has been described. It is endemic to Guinea-Bissau in West Africa. It is one of two living genera of the family Paracharontidae, alongside the South American Jorottui. It is a troglobite, having no eyes, and is found living in termite nests.
