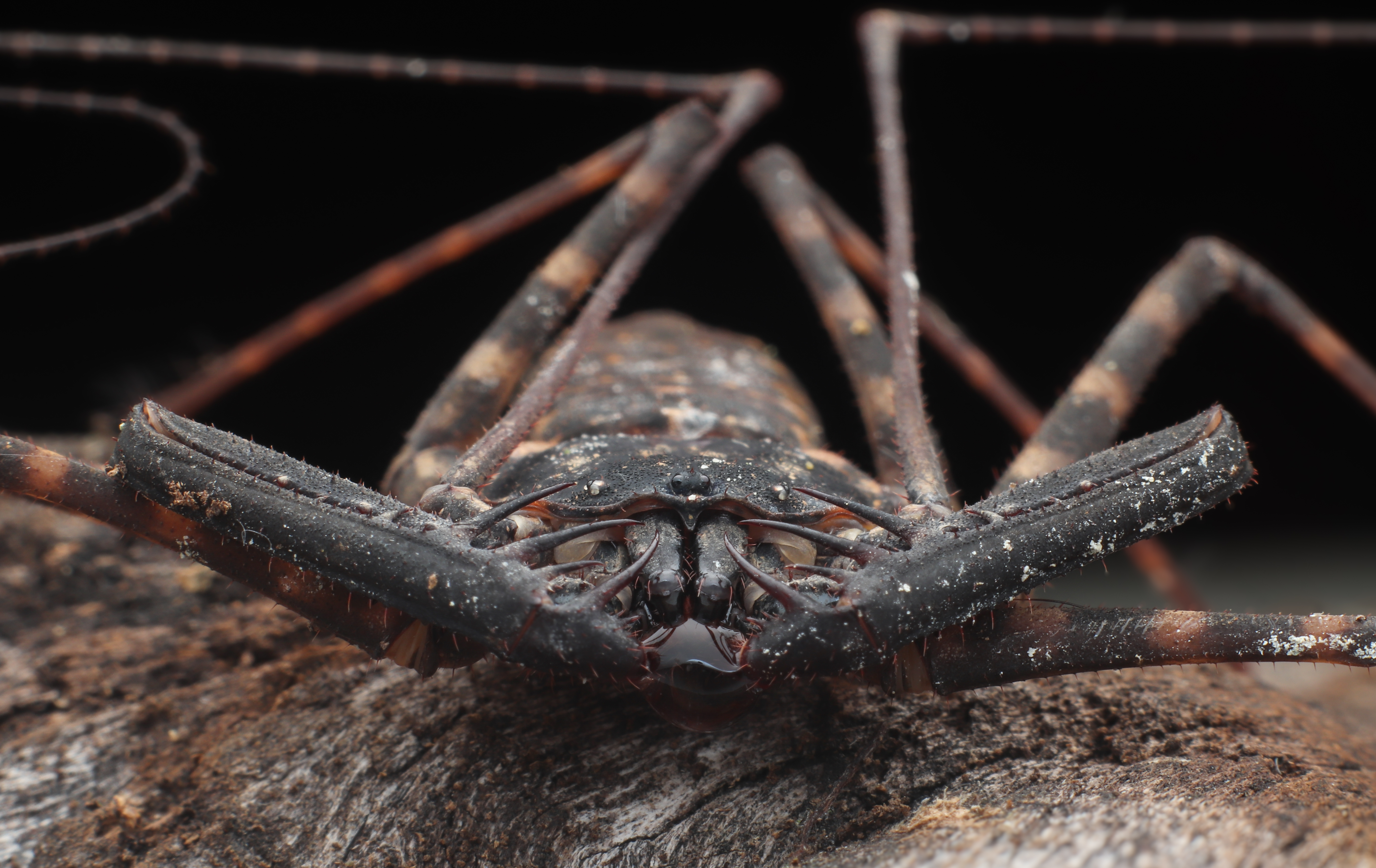
- Charon grayi from the Philippines

Scientific classification
- Kingdom: Animalia
- Phylum: Arthropoda
- Subphylum: Chelicerata
- Class: Arachnida
- Order: Amblypygi
- Family: Charontidae; Simon, 1892

Synonyms
- Charinidae Quintero, 1985

= Charontidae =

Family of arachnids

Charontidae is a family of whipspiders distributed worldwide, mostly in tropical and subtropical areas.

== Description ==
Charinus neocaledonicus, New Caledonia

Most Charontids are small whipspiders, generally less than 15 mm (0.59 in) in total body length, with the exception of Charon. They are the only euamblypygi with pulvilli on the tarsi of their walking legs, enabling them to climb smooth surfaces such as glass.

== Distribution ==
Charontidae is the only amblypygid family that is distributed worldwide. Representatives occur in all continents except Antarctica, albeit with only one species in Europe, Sarax Ioanniticus.

== Taxonomy ==
The family Charontidae is the only family in the superfamily Charontoidea, and is the most basal family of the euamblypygi—the non-paleoamblypygid whipspiders. As such, they are the sister taxon to Phrynoidea, the clade containing the Phrynichidae and the Phrynidae. Charontidae is the most speciose whipspider family, containing at least 160 described species as of 2026, the majority of them in the genus Charinus.

=== Taxonomic history ===
Historically, all the current Charontid genera except Charon were placed in the family Charinidae since that family's description in 1985. However, the discovery and collection of new Paleoamblypygid specimens (now described as Jorottui) enabled the first molecular phylogenetic analysis of the entire amblypygid order. This analysis revealed that the Charontid genera Catageus and Charon were nested within Charinidae. Since Charontidae was described prior to Charinidae, Charinidae was absorbed into Charontidae as a junior synonym. Further revisions of lower level amblypygid taxa are also needed to resolve the several non-monophylies uncovered, including that of Sarax.

== Genera ==
There are currently 5 genera in the family Charontidae:

- Catageus Thorell, 1889
- Charinus Simon, 1892
- Charon Karsch, 1879
- Sarax Simon, 1892
- Weygoldtia Miranda, Giupponi, Prendini & Scharff, 2018
