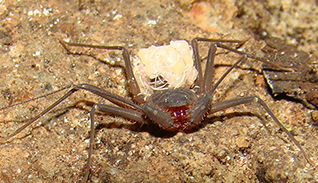
- Charinus vulgaris

Scientific classification
- Kingdom: Animalia
- Phylum: Arthropoda
- Subphylum: Chelicerata
- Class: Arachnida
- Order: Amblypygi
- Family: Charinidae; Quintero, 1986

= Charinidae =

Family of arachnids

Charinidae is an arachnid family within the order of tailless whip-scorpions.

== Genera ==
There are four genera in the family Charinidae.

- Catageus Thorell, 1889
- Charinus Simon, 1892
- Sarax Simon, 1892
- Weygoldtia Miranda, Giupponi, Prendini & Scharff, 2018
