= Phrynichus orientalis =

Scientific classification
- Kingdom: Animalia
- Phylum: Arthropoda
- Subphylum: Chelicerata
- Class: Arachnida
- Order: Amblypygi
- Family: Phrynichidae
- Genus: Phrynichus
- Species: P. orientalis

Binomial name
- Phrynichus orientalis Weygoldt, 1998

Species of arachnid

Phrynichus orientalis is a species of tailless whip-scorpion native to Thailand, Cambodia, and Vietnam.

Unusually for species in the order Amblypygi, the antenniform legs of females are longer than those of males. However, the sexual dimorphism of the pedipalps is more typical of amblypygids, with males having longer pedipalps than females.
