= Attenuizomus mainae =

Scientific classification
- Kingdom: Animalia
- Phylum: Arthropoda
- Subphylum: Chelicerata
- Class: Arachnida
- Order: Schizomida
- Family: Hubbardiidae
- Genus: Attenuizomus
- Species: A. mainae

Binomial name
- Attenuizomus mainae (Harvey, 1992)

Synonyms
- Apozomus mainae Harvey, 1992

Species of short-tailed whip-scorpion

Attenuizomus mainae is a species of schizomid arachnid (commonly known as a short-tailed whip-scorpion) in the Hubbardiidae family. It is endemic to Australia. It was described in 1992 by Australian arachnologist Mark Harvey.

== Distribution and habitat ==
The species occurs in the Top End of the Northern Territory, inhabiting plant litter in open forest habitats. The type locality is the Stuart Highway, 230 km south of Darwin.

== Behaviour ==
The arachnids are terrestrial predators.
