= Julattenius cooloola =

Scientific classification
- Kingdom: Animalia
- Phylum: Arthropoda
- Subphylum: Chelicerata
- Class: Arachnida
- Order: Schizomida
- Family: Hubbardiidae
- Genus: Julattenius
- Species: J. cooloola

Binomial name
- Julattenius cooloola Harvey, 1992

Species of short-tailed whip-scorpion

Julattenius cooloola is a species of schizomid arachnids (commonly known as sprickets or short-tailed whip-scorpions) in the Hubbardiidae family. It is endemic to Australia. It was described in 1992 by Australian arachnologist Mark Harvey. The specific epithet cooloola refers to the type locality.

== Distribution and habitat ==
The species occurs in south-eastern Queensland. The type locality is Searys Creek Rainforest, via Tin Can Bay, near Cooloola in the Wide Bay–Burnett region.
