= Anepsiozomus sobrinus =

Conservation status
- Endangered (IUCN 3.1)

Scientific classification
- Domain: Eukaryota
- Kingdom: Animalia
- Phylum: Arthropoda
- Subphylum: Chelicerata
- Class: Arachnida
- Order: Schizomida
- Family: Hubbardiidae
- Genus: Anepsiozomus
- Species: A. sobrinus

Binomial name
- Anepsiozomus sobrinus Harvey, 2001

Species of whip scorpion

Anepsiozomus sobrinus is a species of hubbardiid short-tailed whipscorpions that is endemic to the Seychelles, and is found on Aride and Cousine Islands. It can be found in leaf litter in coastal woodlands. It is threatened by the rising sea level.
