= Brignolizomus walteri =

Scientific classification
- Kingdom: Animalia
- Phylum: Arthropoda
- Subphylum: Chelicerata
- Class: Arachnida
- Order: Schizomida
- Family: Hubbardiidae
- Genus: Brignolizomus
- Species: B. walteri

Binomial name
- Brignolizomus walteri Harvey, 2000

Species of short-tailed whip-scorpion

Brignolizomus walteri is a species of schizomid arachnid (commonly known as a short-tailed whip-scorpion) in the Hubbardiidae family. It is endemic to Australia. It was described in 2000 by Australian arachnologist Mark Harvey.

== Distribution and habitat ==
The species occurs in south-east Queensland. It inhabits plant litter in open forest habitats. The type locality is Marburg, some 50 km west-south-west of Brisbane.

== Behaviour ==
The arachnids are terrestrial predators.
