= Brignolizomus nob =

Scientific classification
- Kingdom: Animalia
- Phylum: Arthropoda
- Subphylum: Chelicerata
- Class: Arachnida
- Order: Schizomida
- Family: Hubbardiidae
- Genus: Brignolizomus
- Species: B. nob

Binomial name
- Brignolizomus nob (Harvey, 1992)

Synonyms
- Apozomus nob Harvey, 1992

Species of short-tailed whip-scorpion

Brignolizomus nob is a species of schizomid arachnid (commonly known as a short-tailed whip-scorpion) in the Hubbardiidae family. It is endemic to Australia. It was described in 1992 by Australian arachnologist Mark Harvey. The specific epithet nob refers to the type locality.

== Distribution and habitat ==
The species occurs in Central Queensland in plant litter in forest habitats. The type locality is Nob Creek, Byfield, some 70 km north-east of Rockhampton.

== Behaviour ==
The arachnids are terrestrial predators.
