= Attenuizomus cuttacutta =

Scientific classification
- Kingdom: Animalia
- Phylum: Arthropoda
- Subphylum: Chelicerata
- Class: Arachnida
- Order: Schizomida
- Family: Hubbardiidae
- Genus: Attenuizomus
- Species: A. cuttacutta

Binomial name
- Attenuizomus cuttacutta Harvey, 2000

Species of short-tailed whip-scorpion

Attenuizomus cuttacutta is a species of schizomid arachnid (commonly known as a short-tailed whip-scorpion) in the Hubbardiidae family. It is endemic to Australia. It was described in 2000 by Australian arachnologist Mark Harvey. The specific epithet cuttacutta refers to the type locality.

== Distribution and habitat ==
The species occurs in the Northern Territory. The type locality is Cutta Cutta Cave K1, 27 km south of Katherine.

== Behaviour ==
The arachnids are cave-dwelling, terrestrial predators.
