= Julattenius lawrencei =

Scientific classification
- Kingdom: Animalia
- Phylum: Arthropoda
- Subphylum: Chelicerata
- Class: Arachnida
- Order: Schizomida
- Family: Hubbardiidae
- Genus: Julattenius
- Species: J. lawrencei

Binomial name
- Julattenius lawrencei Harvey, 1992

Species of short-tailed whip-scorpion

Julattenius lawrencei is a species of schizomid arachnids (commonly known as sprickets or short-tailed whip-scorpions) in the Hubbardiidae family. It is endemic to Australia. It was described in 1992 by Australian arachnologist Mark Harvey.

== Distribution and habitat ==
The species occurs in Far North Queensland. The type locality is Julatten, at the eastern edge of the Atherton Tableland.
