= Attenuizomus radon =

Scientific classification
- Kingdom: Animalia
- Phylum: Arthropoda
- Subphylum: Chelicerata
- Class: Arachnida
- Order: Schizomida
- Family: Hubbardiidae
- Genus: Attenuizomus
- Species: A. radon

Binomial name
- Attenuizomus radon (Harvey, 1992)

Synonyms
- Apozomus radon Harvey, 1992

Species of short-tailed whip-scorpion

Attenuizomus radon is a species of schizomid arachnid (commonly known as a short-tailed whip-scorpion) in the Hubbardiidae family. It is endemic to Australia. It was described in 1992 by Australian arachnologist Mark Harvey. The specific epithet radon refers to the type locality.

== Distribution and habitat ==
The species occurs in the Top End of the Northern Territory, inhabiting plant litter in open forest habitats. The type locality is Radon Creek (Gulungul Creek), about 11 km south of Jabiru in Kakadu National Park.

== Behaviour ==
The arachnids are terrestrial predators.
