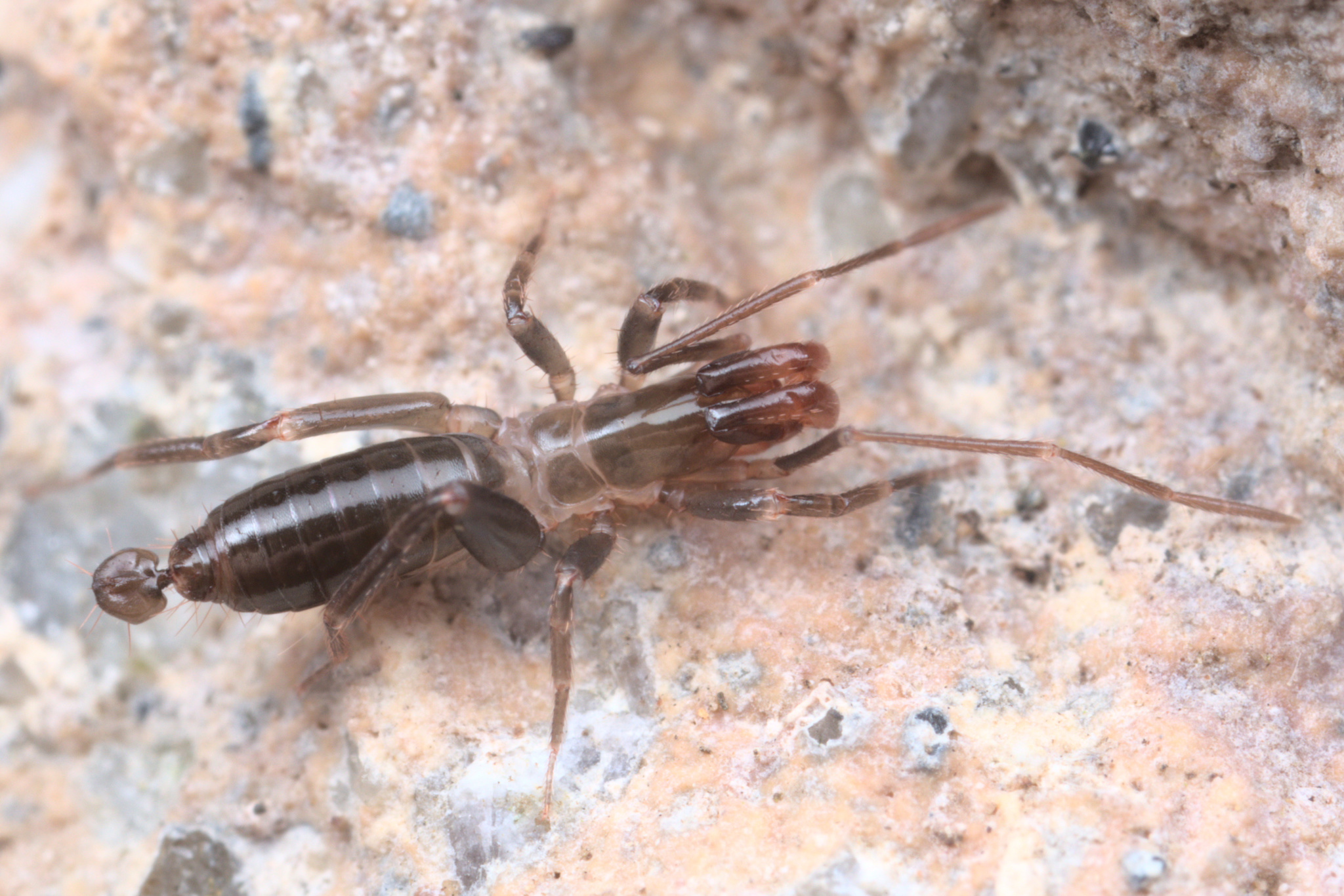

Scientific classification
- Kingdom: Animalia
- Phylum: Arthropoda
- Subphylum: Chelicerata
- Class: Arachnida
- Order: Schizomida
- Family: Hubbardiidae
- Genus: Hubbardia
- Species: H. belkini

Binomial name
- Hubbardia belkini (McDonald & Hogue, 1957)

= Hubbardia belkini =

Species of whip scorpion

Hubbardia belkini is a species of short-tailed whipscorpion in the family Hubbardiidae.

It was described, as Trithyreus belkini, by William A Mcdonald and Charles Leonard Hogue in 1957.
