= Secozomus =

Conservation status
- Data Deficient (IUCN 3.1)

Scientific classification
- Kingdom: Animalia
- Phylum: Arthropoda
- Subphylum: Chelicerata
- Class: Arachnida
- Order: Schizomida
- Family: Hubbardiidae
- Genus: Secozomus; Harvey, 2001
- Species: S. latipes

Binomial name
- Secozomus latipes (Hansen, 1905)

Genus of shorttailed whipscorpions

Secozomus is a monotypic genus of hubbardiid short-tailed whipscorpions, first described by Mark Harvey in 2001. Its single species, Secozomus latipes is distributed in Seychelles.
