= Piaroa (arachnid) =

Scientific classification
- Domain: Eukaryota
- Kingdom: Animalia
- Phylum: Arthropoda
- Subphylum: Chelicerata
- Class: Arachnida
- Order: Schizomida
- Family: Hubbardiidae
- Genus: Piaroa; Villarreal, Giupponi & Tourinho, 2008

Type species
- Piaroa virichaj Villarreal, Giupponi & Tourinho, 2008

Species
- 9, see text

Genus of shorttailed whipscorpions

Piaroa is a genus of hubbardiid short-tailed whipscorpions, first described by Osvaldo Manzanilla, Alessandro Giupponi and Ana Tourinho in 2008.

== Species ==
As of August 2022, the World Schizomida Catalog accepts the following nine species:

- Piaroa bacata Moreno-González, Delgado-Santa & Armas, 2014 – Colombia
- Piaroa bijagua Armas & Víques, 2009 – Costa Rica
- Piaroa escalerete Moreno-González, Delgado-Santa & Armas, 2014 – Colombia
- Piaroa guipongai Villarreal & García, 2012 – Colombia
- Piaroa hoyosi Delgado-Santa & de Armas, 2013 – Colombia
- Piaroa pioi Villarreal, Armas & García, 2014 – Venezuela
- Piaroa turbacoensis Segovia-Paccini, Ahumada-C. & Moreno-González, 2018 – Colombia
- Piaroa virichaj Villarreal, Giupponi & Tourinho, 2008 – Venezuela
- Piaroa youngi Armas & Víquez, 2010 – Costa Rica, Panama
