= Brignolizomus =

Scientific classification
- Kingdom: Animalia
- Phylum: Arthropoda
- Subphylum: Chelicerata
- Class: Arachnida
- Order: Schizomida
- Family: Hubbardiidae
- Genus: Brignolizomus; Harvey, 2000

Genus of short-tailed whip-scorpions

Brignolizomus is a genus of hubbardiid short-tailed whip-scorpions. It is endemic to Australia, and was first described by Mark Harvey in 2000.

== Species ==
The genus comprises three species from Queensland:

- Brignolizomus nob (Harvey, 1992)
- Brignolizomus walteri Harvey, 2000
- Brignolizomus woodwardi (Harvey, 1992)
