= Tayos =

Scientific classification
- Domain: Eukaryota
- Kingdom: Animalia
- Phylum: Arthropoda
- Subphylum: Chelicerata
- Class: Arachnida
- Order: Schizomida
- Family: Hubbardiidae
- Genus: Tayos; Reddell & Cokendolpher, 1995
- Species: T. ashmolei

Binomial name
- Tayos ashmolei (Reddell & Cokendolpher, 1984)

Genus of shorttailed whipscorpions

Tayos is a monotypic genus of hubbardiid short-tailed whipscorpions, first described by Reddell & Cokendolpher in 1995. Its single species, Tayos ashmolei is distributed in Ecuador.
