= Hansenochrus =

Scientific classification
- Domain: Eukaryota
- Kingdom: Animalia
- Phylum: Arthropoda
- Subphylum: Chelicerata
- Class: Arachnida
- Order: Schizomida
- Family: Hubbardiidae
- Genus: Hansenochrus; Reddell & Cokendolpher, 1995

Type species
- Hansenochrus trinidanus (Rowland & Reddell, 1979)

Species
- 17, see text

Genus of shorttailed whipscorpions

Hansenochrus is a genus of hubbardiid short-tailed whipscorpions, first described by Reddell & Cokendolpher in 1995.

== Species ==
As of September 2022, the World Schizomida Catalog accepts the following seventeen species:

- Hansenochrus acrocaudatus (Rowland & Reddell, 1979) – Trinidad and Tobago
- Hansenochrus centralis (Gertsch, 1941) – Panama
- Hansenochrus dispar (Hansen, 1905) – Martinique
- Hansenochrus drakos (Rowland & Reddell, 1979) – Guyana
- Hansenochrus flavescens (Hansen, 1905) – Venezuela
- Hansenochrus gladiator (Rémy, 1961) – Suriname
- Hansenochrus guyanensis Cokendolpher & Reddell, 2000 – Guyana
- Hansenochrus humbertoi Armas & Víquez, 2010 – Costa Rica
- Hansenochrus mumai (Rowland & Reddell, 1979) – Costa Rica
- Hansenochrus selva Armas, 2009 – Costa Rica
- Hansenochrus simonis (Hansen, 1905) – Venezuela
- Hansenochrus surinamensis (Rémy, 1961) – Suriname
- Hansenochrus tobago (Rowland & Reddell, 1979) – Trinidad and Tobago
- Hansenochrus trinidanus (Rowland & Reddell, 1979) – Trinidad and Tobago
- Hansenochrus urbanii Villarreal & Teruel, 2006 – Venezuela
- Hansenochrus vanderdrifti (Rémy, 1961) – Suriname
- Hansenochrus yolandae (González-Sponga, 1997) – Venezuela
