= Burmezomus =

Scientific classification
- Domain: Eukaryota
- Kingdom: Animalia
- Phylum: Arthropoda
- Subphylum: Chelicerata
- Class: Arachnida
- Order: Schizomida
- Family: Hubbardiidae
- Genus: Burmezomus; Bastawade, 2004

Type species
- Burmezomus cavernicola (Gravely, 1912)

Species
- 2, see text

Genus of shorttailed whipscorpions

Burmezomus is a genus of hubbardiid short-tailed whipscorpions, first described by D. B. Bastawade in 2004.

== Species ==
As of September 2022, the World Schizomida Catalog accepts the following two species:

- Burmezomus cavernicola (Gravely, 1912) – Myanmar
- Burmezomus chaibassicus (Bastawade, 2002) – India
