= Heterocubazomus =

Scientific classification
- Domain: Eukaryota
- Kingdom: Animalia
- Phylum: Arthropoda
- Subphylum: Chelicerata
- Class: Arachnida
- Order: Schizomida
- Family: Hubbardiidae
- Genus: Heterocubazomus; Teruel, 2007
- Species: H. sierramaestrae

Binomial name
- Heterocubazomus sierramaestrae Teruel, 2007

Genus of shorttailed whipscorpions

Heterocubazomus is a monotypic genus of hubbardiid short-tailed whipscorpions, first described by Rolando Teruel in 2007. Its single species, Heterocubazomus sierramaestrae is distributed in Cuba.
