= Cokendolpherius =

Scientific classification
- Domain: Eukaryota
- Kingdom: Animalia
- Phylum: Arthropoda
- Subphylum: Chelicerata
- Class: Arachnida
- Order: Schizomida
- Family: Hubbardiidae
- Genus: Cokendolpherius; Armas, 2002

Type species
- Cokendolpherius ramosi Armas, 2002

Species
- 2, see text

Genus of shorttailed whipscorpions

Cokendolpherius is a genus of hubbardiid short-tailed whipscorpions, first described by Luis de Armas in 2002.

== Species ==
As of September 2022, the World Schizomida Catalog accepts the following two species:

- Cokendolpherius jumagua Teruel & Rodriguez, 2010 – Cuba
- Cokendolpherius ramosi Armas, 2002 – Cuba
