= Calcitronidae =

Calcitronidae Temporal range: Pliocene

Scientific classification
- Kingdom: Animalia
- Phylum: Arthropoda
- Subphylum: Chelicerata
- Class: Arachnida
- Order: Thelyphonida
- Family: †Calcitronidae; Petrunkevitch, 1945

Extinct family of whip scorpions

The family Calcitronidae is an extinct group of arachnids. Its two monotypic genera are only known from Pliocene deposits of calcite in Arizona. The family has been placed in the order Schizomida, but a review of the order concluded that "the fossil taxa ... are so poorly known that final placement must await further study and possibly new material", and they are not listed in the order in a 2016 catalog of fossil arachnids.
