= Luisarmasius =

Scientific classification
- Domain: Eukaryota
- Kingdom: Animalia
- Phylum: Arthropoda
- Subphylum: Chelicerata
- Class: Arachnida
- Order: Schizomida
- Family: Hubbardiidae
- Genus: Luisarmasius; Reddell & Cokendolpher, 1995
- Species: L. yunquensis

Binomial name
- Luisarmasius yunquensis (Camilo & Cokendolpher, 1988)

Genus of shorttailed whipscorpions

Luisarmasius is a monotypic genus of hubbardiid short-tailed whipscorpions, first described by Reddell & Cokendolpher in 1995. Its single species, Luisarmasius yunquensis is distributed in Puerto Rico.
