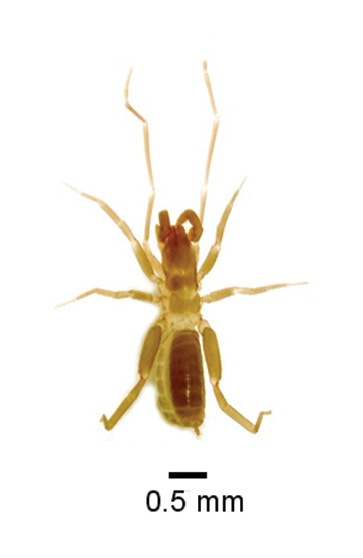

Scientific classification
- Kingdom: Animalia
- Phylum: Arthropoda
- Subphylum: Chelicerata
- Class: Arachnida
- Order: Schizomida
- Family: Hubbardiidae
- Genus: Stenochrus
- Species: S. portoricensis

Binomial name
- Stenochrus portoricensis Chamberlin, 1922

= Stenochrus portoricensis =

Species of whip scorpion

Stenochrus portoricensis is a species of arachnid belonging to the family Hubbardiidae in the order Schizomida, which are commonly known as short-tailed whip scorpions. They are mostly found in North and Central America, but their parthenogenetic lifestyle allows them to live in other parts of the world in temperate climates. They are able to thrive in different parts of the world, especially in caves, forests, fallen logs, and abandoned nests of termites.
