= Dumitrescoella =

Scientific classification
- Domain: Eukaryota
- Kingdom: Animalia
- Phylum: Arthropoda
- Subphylum: Chelicerata
- Class: Arachnida
- Order: Schizomida
- Family: Hubbardiidae
- Genus: Dumitrescoella; Teruel, 2017
- Species: D. decui

Binomial name
- Dumitrescoella decui (Dumitresco, 1977)

Genus of shorttailed whipscorpions

Dumitrescoella is a monotypic genus of hubbardiid short-tailed whipscorpions, first described by Rolando Teruel in 2017. Its single species, Dumitrescoella decui is distributed in Cuba.
