= Enigmazomus =

Scientific classification
- Domain: Eukaryota
- Kingdom: Animalia
- Phylum: Arthropoda
- Subphylum: Chelicerata
- Class: Arachnida
- Order: Schizomida
- Family: Hubbardiidae
- Genus: Enigmazomus; Harvey, 2006

Type species
- Enigmazomus eruptoclausus Harvey, 2006

Species
- 2, see text

Genus of shorttailed whipscorpions

Enigmazomus is a genus of hubbardiid short-tailed whipscorpions, first described by Mark Harvey in 2006.

== Species ==
As of September 2022, the World Schizomida Catalog accepts the following two species:

- Enigmazomus benoiti (Lawrence, 1969) – Somalia
- Enigmazomus eruptoclausus Harvey, 2006 – Oman
