= Hubbardia (disambiguation) =

Hubbardia may refer to:

- Hubbardia, a genus of grasses in the family Poaceae
- Hubbardia (arachnid), a genus of arachnids in the family Hubbardiidae
