= Trithyreus =

Scientific classification
- Domain: Eukaryota
- Kingdom: Animalia
- Phylum: Arthropoda
- Subphylum: Chelicerata
- Class: Arachnida
- Order: Schizomida
- Family: Hubbardiidae
- Genus: Trithyreus; Kraepelin, 1899

Type species
- Trithyreus grassii (Thorell, 1889)

Species
- 2, see text

Genus of shorttailed whipscorpions

Trithyreus is a genus of hubbardiid short-tailed whipscorpions, first described by Karl Kraepelin in 1899.

== Species ==
As of September 2022, the World Schizomida Catalog accepts the following two species:

- Trithyreus grassii (Thorell, 1889) – Myanmar
- Trithyreus sijuensis (Gravely, 1924) – India
