= Julattenius =

Scientific classification
- Domain: Eukaryota
- Kingdom: Animalia
- Phylum: Arthropoda
- Subphylum: Chelicerata
- Class: Arachnida
- Order: Schizomida
- Family: Hubbardiidae
- Genus: Julattenius; Harvey, 1992

Type species
- Julattenius lawrencei Harvey, 1992

Species
- 2, see text

Genus of shorttailed whipscorpions

Julattenius is a genus of hubbardiid short-tailed whipscorpions, or sprickets. It is endemic to Australia, and was first described by Mark Harvey in 1992.

== Species ==
As of September 2023, the World Arachnida Catalog accepted the following two species found in Queensland:

- Julattenius cooloola Harvey, 1992
- Julattenius lawrencei Harvey, 1992
