= Protoschizomidae =

Protoschizomidae Temporal range: Pliocene–Present

Scientific classification
- Kingdom: Animalia
- Phylum: Arthropoda
- Subphylum: Chelicerata
- Class: Arachnida
- Order: Schizomida
- Family: Protoschizomidae; Rowland, 1975

Genera
- Agastoschizomus Rowland, 1971; Protoschizomus Rowland, 1975

Family of shorttailed whipscorpions

The family Protoschizomidae is a group of arachnids in the order Schizomida (short-tailed whipscorpions). It is the smaller of the two extant families within the order, alongside the much larger and more globally distributed Hubbardiidae. The family was originally described by J. Mark Rowland in 1975. Members of this family are endemic to North America, where they are primarily distributed throughout the cave systems of Mexico (such as the Sierra Madre Oriental and Sierra Madre Occidental systems) and in neighboring parts of Texas, United States.

== Genera ==
As of April 2026, the World Schizomida Catalog accepts the following two extant genera:

- Agastoschizomus Rowland, 1971
- Protoschizomus Rowland, 1975
