= Olmecazomus =

Scientific classification
- Domain: Eukaryota
- Kingdom: Animalia
- Phylum: Arthropoda
- Subphylum: Chelicerata
- Class: Arachnida
- Order: Schizomida
- Family: Hubbardiidae
- Genus: Olmecazomus; Monjaraz-Ruedas, Prendini & Francke, 2017

Type species
- Olmecazomus cruzlopezi Monjaraz-Ruedas & Francke, 2017

Species
- 3, see text

Genus of shorttailed whipscorpions

Olmecazomus is a genus of hubbardiid short-tailed whipscorpions, first described by R. Monjaraz-Ruedas, L. Prendini and O.F. Francke in 2017.

== Species ==
As of August 2023, the World Schizomida Catalog accepts the following three species:

- Olmecazomus brujo Monjaraz-Ruedas & Francke, 2017 — Mexico
- Olmecazomus cruzlopezi Monjaraz-Ruedas & Francke, 2017 — Mexico
- Olmecazomus santibanezi Monjaraz-Ruedas & Francke, 2017 — Mexico
