= Pacal (arachnid) =

Scientific classification
- Domain: Eukaryota
- Kingdom: Animalia
- Phylum: Arthropoda
- Subphylum: Chelicerata
- Class: Arachnida
- Order: Schizomida
- Family: Hubbardiidae
- Genus: Pacal; Reddell & Cokendolpher, 1995

Type species
- Pacal lacandonus (Rowland, 1975)

Species
- 3, see text

Genus of shorttailed whipscorpions

Pacal is a genus of hubbardiid short-tailed whipscorpions, first described by Reddell & Cokendolpher in 1995.

== Species ==
As of September 2022, the World Schizomida Catalog accepts the following three species:

- Pacal lacandonus (Rowland, 1975) – Mexico
- Pacal stewarti (Rowland, 1973) – Mexico
- Pacal trilobatus (Rowland, 1975) – Mexico
