= Colombiazomus =

Scientific classification
- Domain: Eukaryota
- Kingdom: Animalia
- Phylum: Arthropoda
- Subphylum: Chelicerata
- Class: Arachnida
- Order: Schizomida
- Family: Hubbardiidae
- Genus: Colombiazomus; Armas & Delgado-Santa, 2012
- Species: C. truncatus

Binomial name
- Colombiazomus truncatus Armas & Delgado-Santa, 2012

Genus of shorttailed whipscorpions

Colombiazomus is a monotypic genus of hubbardiid short-tailed whipscorpions, first described by Armas & Delgado-Santa in 2012. Its single species, Colombiazomus truncatus is distributed in Colombia.
