= Naderiore =

Scientific classification
- Domain: Eukaryota
- Kingdom: Animalia
- Phylum: Arthropoda
- Subphylum: Chelicerata
- Class: Arachnida
- Order: Schizomida
- Family: Hubbardiidae
- Genus: Naderiore; Pinto-da-Rocha, Andrade, R. & Moreno-González, 2016
- Species: N. carajas

Binomial name
- Naderiore carajas Pinto-da-Rocha, Andrade, R. & Moreno-González, 2016

Genus of shorttailed whipscorpions

Naderiore is a monotypic genus of hubbardiid short-tailed whipscorpions, first described by Pinto-da-Rocha, Andrade & Moreno-González in 2016. Its single species, Naderiore carajas is distributed in Brazil.
