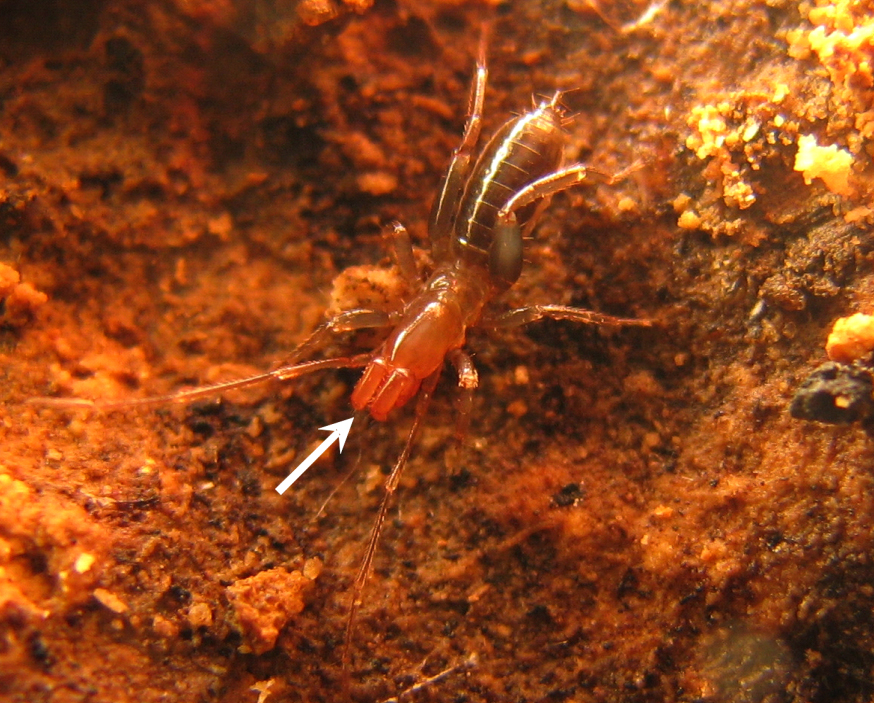

Scientific classification
- Domain: Eukaryota
- Kingdom: Animalia
- Phylum: Arthropoda
- Subphylum: Chelicerata
- Class: Arachnida
- Order: Schizomida
- Family: Hubbardiidae
- Genus: Rowlandius; Reddell & Cokendolpher, 1995

Type species
- Rowlandius viridis (Rowland & Reddell, 1979)

Species
- 62, see text

= Rowlandius =

Genus of shorttailed whipscorpions

Rowlandius is a genus of hubbardiid short-tailed whipscorpions, first described by Reddell & Cokendolpher in 1995.

== Species ==
As of June 2022, the World Schizomida Catalog accepts the following sixty-two species:

- Rowlandius abeli Armas, 2002 – Cuba
- Rowlandius alayoni (Armas, 1989) – Cuba
- Rowlandius anasilviae (Armas & Abud Antun, 1990) – Dominican Republic
- Rowlandius arduus Armas, Villarreal & Colmenares-García, 2009 – Venezuela
- Rowlandius arenicola Teruel, Armas & Rodríguez, 2012 – Cuba
- Rowlandius baracoae (Armas, 1989) – Cuba
- Rowlandius biconourus (Rowland & Reddell, 1979) – Cuba
- Rowlandius candidae Teruel, Armas & Rodríguez, 2012 – Cuba
- Rowlandius casabito (Armas & Abud Antun, 1990) – Dominican Republic
- Rowlandius chinoi Armas, 2010 – Puerto Rico
- Rowlandius cousinensis (Rowland & Reddell, 1979) – Jamaica
- Rowlandius cubanacan (Armas, 1989) – Cuba
- Rowlandius cupeyalensis Armas, 2002 – Cuba
- Rowlandius decui (Dumitresco, 1977) – Cuba
- Rowlandius desecheo (Rowland & Reddell, 1979) – Puerto Rico
- Rowlandius digitiger (Dumitresco, 1977) – Cuba
- Rowlandius ducoudrayi (Armas & Abud Antun, 1990) – Dominican Republic
- Rowlandius dumitrescoae (Rowland & Reddell, 1979) – Costa Rica
- Rowlandius engombe Armas & Abud Antun, 2002 – Dominican Republic
- Rowlandius falcifemur Teruel, 2003 – Cuba
- Rowlandius florenciae Teruel, 2003 – Cuba
- Rowlandius gladiger (Dumitresco, 1977) – Cuba
- Rowlandius gracilis Teruel, 2004 – Cuba
- Rowlandius guama Teruel & Armas, 2012 – Cuba
- Rowlandius guamuhaya Teruel, Armas & Rodríguez, 2012 – Cuba
- Rowlandius guantanamero Teruel, 2004 – Cuba
- Rowlandius insignis (Hansen, 1905) – Martinique
- Rowlandius isabel Armas & Abud Antun, 2002 – Dominican Republic
- Rowlandius jarmillae Armas & Cokendolpher, 2002 – Dominican Republic
- Rowlandius labarcae (Armas, 1989) – Cuba
- Rowlandius lantiguai (Armas & Abud Antun, 1990) – Dominican Republic
- Rowlandius linsduarteae Santos, Dias, Brescovit & Santos, 2008 – Brazil
- Rowlandius littoralis Teruel, 2003 – Cuba
- Rowlandius longipalpus (Rowland & Reddell, 1979) – Dominican Republic, Haiti
- Rowlandius marianae Teruel, 2003 – Cuba
- Rowlandius melici Teruel, 2003 – Cuba
- Rowlandius mixtus Teruel, 2004 – Cuba
- Rowlandius moa Armas, 2004 – Cuba
- Rowlandius monensis (Rowland & Reddell, 1979) – Puerto Rico
- Rowlandius monticola Armas, 2002 – Cuba
- Rowlandius naranjo (Armas & Abud Antun, 1990) – Dominican Republic
- Rowlandius negreai (Dumitresco, 1973) – Cuba
- Rowlandius peckorum (Rowland & Reddell, 1979) – Jamaica
- Rowlandius potiguar Santos, Ferreira & Buzatto, 2013 – Brazil
- Rowlandius primibiconourus (Rowland & Reddell, 1979) – Jamaica
- Rowlandius ramosi Armas, 2002 – Cuba
- Rowlandius reconditus Teruel, Armas & Rodríguez, 2012 – Cuba
- Rowlandius recuerdo (Armas, 1989) – Cuba
- Rowlandius reyesi Teruel, 2000 – Cuba
- Rowlandius serrano Teruel, 2003 – Cuba
- Rowlandius siboney Armas, 2002 – Cuba
- Rowlandius steineri Armas, 2002 – Navassa Island
- Rowlandius sul Cokendolpher & Reddell, 2000 – Brazil
- Rowlandius terueli Armas, 2002 – Cuba
- Rowlandius toldo Armas, 2002 – Cuba
- Rowlandius tomasi Armas, 2007 – Cuba
- Rowlandius ubajara Santos, Ferreira & Buzatto, 2013 – Brazil
- Rowlandius vinai Teruel, 2003 – Cuba
- Rowlandius viquezi Armas, 2009 – Costa Rica
- Rowlandius virginiae Armas & Abud Antun, 2002 – Dominican Republic
- Rowlandius viridis (Rowland & Reddell, 1979) – Jamaica
- †Rowlandius velteni (Krüger & Dunlop, 2010) – Dominican Republic (Miocene Amber)
