= Megaschizomus =

Scientific classification
- Domain: Eukaryota
- Kingdom: Animalia
- Phylum: Arthropoda
- Subphylum: Chelicerata
- Class: Arachnida
- Order: Schizomida
- Family: Hubbardiidae
- Genus: Megaschizomus; Lawrence, 1969

Type species
- Megaschizomus mossambicus (Lawrence, 1958)

Species
- 2, see text

Genus of shorttailed whipscorpions

Megaschizomus is a genus of hubbardiid short-tailed whipscorpions, first described by Reginald Frederick Lawrence in 1969.

== Species ==
As of September 2022, the World Schizomida Catalog accepts the following two species:

- Megaschizomus mossambicus (Lawrence, 1958) – Mozambique
- Megaschizomus zuluanus (Lawrence, 1947) – South Africa
