= Mayazomus =

Scientific classification
- Domain: Eukaryota
- Kingdom: Animalia
- Phylum: Arthropoda
- Subphylum: Chelicerata
- Class: Arachnida
- Order: Schizomida
- Family: Hubbardiidae
- Genus: Mayazomus; Reddell & Cokendolpher, 1995

Type species
- Mayazomus infernalis (Rowland, 1975)

Species
- 7, see text

Genus of shorttailed whipscorpions

Mayazomus is a genus of hubbardiid short-tailed whipscorpions, first described by Reddell & Cokendolpher in 1995.

== Species ==
As of June 2022, the World Schizomida Catalog accepts the following seven species:

- Mayazomus aluxe Monjaraz-Ruedas & Francke, 2015 – Mexico
- Mayazomus hoffmannae (Reddell & Cokendolpher, 1986) – Mexico
- Mayazomus infernalis (Rowland, 1975) – Mexico
- Mayazomus kaamuul Monjaraz-Ruedas & Francke, 2015 – Mexico
- Mayazomus loobil Monjaraz-Ruedas & Francke, 2015 – Mexico
- Mayazomus tzotzil Monjaraz-Ruedas & Francke, 2015 – Mexico
- Mayazomus yaax Monjaraz-Ruedas & Francke, 2015 – Mexico
