= Cubazomus =

Scientific classification
- Domain: Eukaryota
- Kingdom: Animalia
- Phylum: Arthropoda
- Subphylum: Chelicerata
- Class: Arachnida
- Order: Schizomida
- Family: Hubbardiidae
- Genus: Cubazomus; Reddell & Cokendolpher, 1995

Type species
- Cubazomus armasi (Rowland & Reddell, 1981)

Species
- 2, see text

Genus of shorttailed whipscorpions

Cubazomus is a genus of hubbardiid short-tailed whipscorpions, first described by Reddell & Cokendolpher in 1995.

== Species ==
As of September 2022, the World Schizomida Catalog accepts the following two species:

- Cubazomus armasi (Rowland & Reddell, 1981) – Cuba
- Cubazomus montanus Teruel, 2004 – Cuba
