= Anepsiozomus =

Scientific classification
- Domain: Eukaryota
- Kingdom: Animalia
- Phylum: Arthropoda
- Subphylum: Chelicerata
- Class: Arachnida
- Order: Schizomida
- Family: Hubbardiidae
- Genus: Anepsiozomus; Harvey, 2001

Type species
- Anepsiozomus sobrinus Harvey, 2001

Species
- 2, see text

Genus of shorttailed whipscorpions

Anepsiozomus is a genus of hubbardiid short-tailed whipscorpions, first described by Mark Harvey in 2001.

== Species ==
As of September 2022, the World Schizomida Catalog accepts the following two species:

- Anepsiozomus harteni Harvey, 2006 – Yemen (Socotra)
- Anepsiozomus sobrinus Harvey, 2001 – Seychelles
