= Wayuuzomus =

Scientific classification
- Domain: Eukaryota
- Kingdom: Animalia
- Phylum: Arthropoda
- Subphylum: Chelicerata
- Class: Arachnida
- Order: Schizomida
- Family: Hubbardiidae
- Genus: Wayuuzomus; Armas & Colmenares, 2006
- Species: W. gonzalezspongai

Binomial name
- Wayuuzomus gonzalezspongai Armas & Colmenares, 2006

Genus of shorttailed whipscorpions

Wayuuzomus is a monotypic genus of hubbardiid short-tailed whipscorpions, first described by Armas & Colmenares in 2006. Its single species, Wayuuzomus gonzalezspongai is distributed in Venezuela.
