= Lawrencezomus =

Scientific classification
- Domain: Eukaryota
- Kingdom: Animalia
- Phylum: Arthropoda
- Subphylum: Chelicerata
- Class: Arachnida
- Order: Schizomida
- Family: Hubbardiidae
- Genus: Lawrencezomus; Armas, 2014

Type species
- Lawrencezomus atlanticus Armas, 2014

Species
- 2, see text

Genus of shorttailed whipscorpions

Lawrencezomus is a genus of hubbardiid short-tailed whipscorpions, first described by Luis de Armas in 2014.

== Species ==
As of September 2022, the World Schizomida Catalog accepts the following two species:

- Lawrencezomus atlanticus Armas, 2014 – Cameroon
- Lawrencezomus bong Armas, 2014 – Liberia
