= Bucinozomus =

Scientific classification
- Domain: Eukaryota
- Kingdom: Animalia
- Phylum: Arthropoda
- Subphylum: Chelicerata
- Class: Arachnida
- Order: Schizomida
- Family: Hubbardiidae
- Genus: Bucinozomus; Armas & Rehfeldt, 2015
- Species: B. hortuspalmarum

Binomial name
- Bucinozomus hortuspalmarum Armas & Rehfeldt, 2015

Genus of shorttailed whipscorpions

Bucinozomus is a monotypic genus of hubbardiid short-tailed whipscorpions, first described by Armas & Rehfeldt in 2015. Its single species, Bucinozomus hortuspalmarum is distributed in Germany.
