= Mahezomus =

Conservation status
- Critically Endangered (IUCN 3.1)

Scientific classification
- Kingdom: Animalia
- Phylum: Arthropoda
- Subphylum: Chelicerata
- Class: Arachnida
- Order: Schizomida
- Family: Hubbardiidae
- Genus: Mahezomus; Harvey, 2001
- Species: M. apicoporus

Binomial name
- Mahezomus apicoporus Harvey, 2001

Genus of shorttailed whipscorpions

Mahezomus is a monotypic genus of hubbardiid short-tailed whipscorpions, first described by Mark Harvey in 2001. Its single species, Mahezomus apicoporus is distributed in Seychelles.
