= Harveyus =

Scientific classification
- Domain: Eukaryota
- Kingdom: Animalia
- Phylum: Arthropoda
- Subphylum: Chelicerata
- Class: Arachnida
- Order: Schizomida
- Family: Hubbardiidae
- Genus: Harveyus; Monjaraz-Ruedas, Prendini & Francke, 2019

Type species
- Harveyus mexicanus (Rowland, 1971)

Species
- 3, see text

Genus of shorttailed whipscorpions

Harveyus is a genus of hubbardiid short-tailed whipscorpions, first described by Monjaraz-Ruedas, Prendini & Francke in 2019.

== Species ==
As of September 2022, the World Schizomida Catalog accepts the following three species:

- Harveyus mexicanus (Rowland, 1971) – Mexico
- Harveyus mulaiki (Gertsch, 1940) – US (Texas)
- Harveyus reddelli (Rowland, 1971) – Mexico
