= Kenyazomus =

Scientific classification
- Domain: Eukaryota
- Kingdom: Animalia
- Phylum: Arthropoda
- Subphylum: Chelicerata
- Class: Arachnida
- Order: Schizomida
- Family: Hubbardiidae
- Genus: Kenyazomus; Armas, 2014
- Species: K. pekkai

Binomial name
- Kenyazomus pekkai Armas, 2014

Genus of shorttailed whipscorpions

Kenyazomus is a monotypic genus of hubbardiid short-tailed whipscorpions, first described by Luis de Armas in 2014. Its single species, Kenyazomus pekkai is distributed in Kenya.
