= Stenochrus =

Scientific classification
- Kingdom: Animalia
- Phylum: Arthropoda
- Subphylum: Chelicerata
- Class: Arachnida
- Order: Schizomida
- Family: Hubbardiidae
- Subfamily: Hubbardiinae
- Genus: Stenochrus; Chamberlin, 1922

Type species
- Stenochrus portoricensis Chamberlin, 1922

Species
- 10, see text

Genus of shorttailed whipscorpions

Stenochrus is a genus of hubbardiid short-tailed whipscorpions, first described by Ralph Vary Chamberlin in 1922.

== Species ==
As of September 2022, the World Schizomida Catalog accepts the following ten species:

- Stenochrus alcalai Monjaraz-Ruedas & Francke, 2018 – Mexico
- Stenochrus chimalapas Monjaraz-Ruedas & Francke, 2018 – Mexico
- Stenochrus gruta Monjaraz-Ruedas & Francke, 2018 – Mexico
- Stenochrus guatemalensis (Chamberlin, 1922) – Guatemala
- Stenochrus leon Armas, 1995 – Nicaragua
- Stenochrus meambar Armas & Víquez, 2010 – Honduras
- Stenochrus moisii (Rowland, 1973) – Mexico
- Stenochrus pecki (Rowland, 1973) – Mexico
- Stenochrus portoricensis Chamberlin, 1922 – North America, South America, Europe
- Stenochrus tepezcuintle Armas & Cruz López, 2009 – Mexico
