= Schizophyxia =

Scientific classification
- Domain: Eukaryota
- Kingdom: Animalia
- Phylum: Arthropoda
- Subphylum: Chelicerata
- Class: Arachnida
- Order: Schizomida
- Family: Hubbardiidae
- Genus: Schizophyxia; Monjaraz-Ruedas, Prendini & Francke, 2019

Type species
- Schizophyxia lukensi (Rowland, 1973)

Species
- 2, see text

Genus of shorttailed whipscorpions

Schizophyxia is a genus of hubbardiid short-tailed whipscorpions, first described by Monjaraz-Ruedas, Prendini & Francke in 2019.

== Species ==
As of September 2022, the World Schizomida Catalog accepts the following two species:

- Schizophyxia bartolo (Rowland, 1973) – Mexico
- Schizophyxia lukensi (Rowland, 1973) – Mexico
