= Clavizomus =

Scientific classification
- Domain: Eukaryota
- Kingdom: Animalia
- Phylum: Arthropoda
- Subphylum: Chelicerata
- Class: Arachnida
- Order: Schizomida
- Family: Hubbardiidae
- Genus: Clavizomus; Reddell & Cokendolpher, 1995
- Species: C. claviger

Binomial name
- Clavizomus claviger (Hansen, 1905)

Genus of shorttailed whipscorpions

Clavizomus is a monotypic genus of hubbardiid short-tailed whipscorpions, first described by Reddell & Cokendolpher in 1995. Its single species, Clavizomus claviger is distributed in Malaysia and Singapore.
