= Ambulantactus =

Scientific classification
- Domain: Eukaryota
- Kingdom: Animalia
- Phylum: Arthropoda
- Subphylum: Chelicerata
- Class: Arachnida
- Order: Schizomida
- Family: Hubbardiidae
- Genus: Ambulantactus; Monjaraz-Ruedas, Prendini & Francke, 2019

Type species
- Ambulantactus montielae Monjaraz-Ruedas, Prendini & Francke, 2019

Species
- 3, see text

Genus of shorttailed whipscorpions

Ambulantactus is a genus of hubbardiid short-tailed whipscorpions, first described by Monjaraz-Ruedas, Prendini & Francke in 2019. The species of this genus can be identified by their pedipalps.

== Species ==
As of September 2022, the World Schizomida Catalog accepts the following three species:

- Ambulantactus aquismon Monjaraz-Ruedas, Prendini & Francke, 2019 – Mexico
- Ambulantactus davisi (Gertsch, 1940) – Mexico
- Ambulantactus montielae Monjaraz-Ruedas, Prendini & Francke, 2019 – Mexico
