= Attenuizomus =

Scientific classification
- Domain: Eukaryota
- Kingdom: Animalia
- Phylum: Arthropoda
- Subphylum: Chelicerata
- Class: Arachnida
- Order: Schizomida
- Family: Hubbardiidae
- Genus: Attenuizomus; Harvey, 2000

Type species
- Attenuizomus mainae (Harvey, 1992)

Genus of short-tailed whip-scorpions

Attenuizomus is a genus of hubbardiid short-tailed whip-scorpions. It is endemic to Australia, and was first described by Mark Harvey in 2000.

== Species ==
As of September 2022, the World Schizomida Catalog accepted the following four species, all from the Northern Territory:

- Attenuizomus baroalba Harvey, 2000
- Attenuizomus cuttacutta Harvey, 2000
- Attenuizomus mainae (Harvey, 1992)
- Attenuizomus radon (Harvey, 1992)
