= Cubacanthozomus =

Scientific classification
- Domain: Eukaryota
- Kingdom: Animalia
- Phylum: Arthropoda
- Subphylum: Chelicerata
- Class: Arachnida
- Order: Schizomida
- Family: Hubbardiidae
- Genus: Cubacanthozomus; Teruel, 2007
- Species: C. rowlandi

Binomial name
- Cubacanthozomus rowlandi (Dumitresco, 1973)

Genus of shorttailed whipscorpions

Cubacanthozomus is a monotypic genus of hubbardiid short-tailed whipscorpions, first described by Rolando Teruel in 2007. Its single species, Cubacanthozomus rowlandi is distributed in Cuba.
