= Belicenochrus =

Scientific classification
- Domain: Eukaryota
- Kingdom: Animalia
- Phylum: Arthropoda
- Subphylum: Chelicerata
- Class: Arachnida
- Order: Schizomida
- Family: Hubbardiidae
- Subfamily: Hubbardiinae
- Genus: Belicenochrus; Armas & Víquez, 2010

Type species
- Belicenochrus pentalatus Armas & Víquez, 2010

Species
- 2, see text

Genus of shorttailed whipscorpions

Belicenochrus is a genus of hubbardiid short-tailed whipscorpions, first described by Armas & Víquez in 2010.

== Species ==
As of September 2022, the World Schizomida Catalog accepts the following two species:

- Belicenochrus peckorum Armas & Víquez, 2010 – Belize
- Belicenochrus pentalatus Armas & Víquez, 2010 – Belize
