= Guanazomus =

Scientific classification
- Domain: Eukaryota
- Kingdom: Animalia
- Phylum: Arthropoda
- Subphylum: Chelicerata
- Class: Arachnida
- Order: Schizomida
- Family: Hubbardiidae
- Genus: Guanazomus; Teruel & Armas, 2002
- Species: G. armatus

Binomial name
- Guanazomus armatus Teruel & Armas, 2002

Genus of shorttailed whipscorpions

Guanazomus is a monotypic genus of hubbardiid short-tailed whipscorpions, first described by Teruel and Armas in 2002. Its single species, Guanazomus armatus is distributed in Cuba.
