= Stenoschizomus =

Scientific classification
- Domain: Eukaryota
- Kingdom: Animalia
- Phylum: Arthropoda
- Subphylum: Chelicerata
- Class: Arachnida
- Order: Schizomida
- Family: Hubbardiidae
- Genus: Stenoschizomus; González-Sponga, 1997
- Species: S. tejeriensis

Binomial name
- Stenoschizomus tejeriensis González-Sponga, 1997

Genus of shorttailed whipscorpions

Stenoschizomus is a monotypic genus of hubbardiid short-tailed whipscorpions, first described by Manuel González-Sponga in 1997. Its single species, Stenoschizomus tejeriensis is distributed in Venezuela.
