= Nahual (arachnid) =

Scientific classification
- Domain: Eukaryota
- Kingdom: Animalia
- Phylum: Arthropoda
- Subphylum: Chelicerata
- Class: Arachnida
- Order: Schizomida
- Family: Hubbardiidae
- Genus: Nahual; Monjaraz-Ruedas, Prendini & Francke, 2019

Type species
- Nahual pallidus (Rowland, 1975)

Species
- 4, see text

Genus of shorttailed whipscorpions

Nahual is a genus of hubbardiid short-tailed whipscorpions, first described by Monjaraz-Ruedas, Prendini & Francke in 2019.

== Species ==
As of September 2022, the World Schizomida Catalog accepts the following four species:

- Nahual bokmai Monjaraz-Ruedas, Prendini & Francke, 2019 – Mexico
- Nahual caballero (Monjaraz-Ruedas & Francke, 2018) – Mexico
- Nahual lanceolatus (Rowland, 1975) – Mexico
- Nahual pallidus (Rowland, 1975) – Mexico
