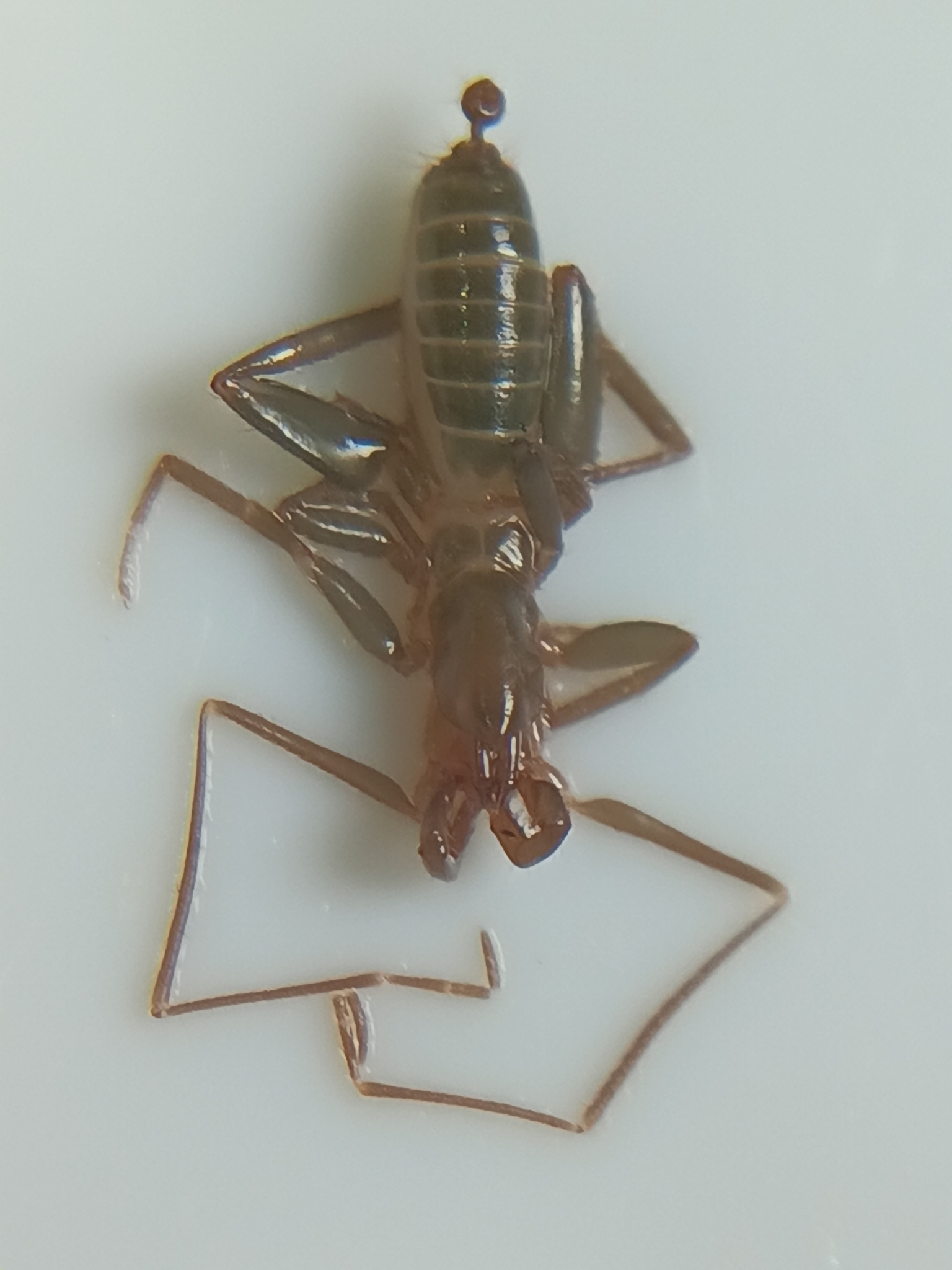
- Orientzomus luzonicus

Scientific classification
- Domain: Eukaryota
- Kingdom: Animalia
- Phylum: Arthropoda
- Subphylum: Chelicerata
- Class: Arachnida
- Order: Schizomida
- Family: Hubbardiidae
- Genus: Orientzomus; Cokendolpher & Tsurusaki, 1994

Type species
- Orientzomus sawadai (Kishida, 1930)

Species
- 3, see text

= Orientzomus =

Genus of shorttailed whipscorpions

Orientzomus is a genus of hubbardiid short-tailed whipscorpions, first described by Cokendolpher & Tsurusaki in 1994.

== Species ==
As of September 2022, the World Schizomida Catalog accepts the following three species:

- Orientzomus luzonicus (Hansen, 1905) – Philippines
- Orientzomus ralik Cokendolpher & Reddell, 2000 – Marshall Islands
- Orientzomus sawadai (Kishida, 1930) – Japan
