= Troglocubazomus =

Scientific classification
- Domain: Eukaryota
- Kingdom: Animalia
- Phylum: Arthropoda
- Subphylum: Chelicerata
- Class: Arachnida
- Order: Schizomida
- Family: Hubbardiidae
- Genus: Troglocubazomus; Teruel, 2003
- Species: T. orghidani

Binomial name
- Troglocubazomus orghidani (Dumitresco, 1977)

Genus of shorttailed whipscorpions

Troglocubazomus is a monotypic genus of hubbardiid short-tailed whipscorpions, first described by Rolando Teruel in 2003. Its single species, Troglocubazomus orghidani is distributed in Cuba.
