= Neozomus =

Scientific classification
- Domain: Eukaryota
- Kingdom: Animalia
- Phylum: Arthropoda
- Subphylum: Chelicerata
- Class: Arachnida
- Order: Schizomida
- Family: Hubbardiidae
- Genus: Neozomus; Reddell & Cokendolpher, 1995
- Species: N. tikaderi

Binomial name
- Neozomus tikaderi (Cokendolpher, Sissom & Bastawade, 1988)

Genus of shorttailed whipscorpions

Neozomus is a monotypic genus of hubbardiid short-tailed whipscorpions, first described by Reddell & Cokendolpher in 1995. Its single species, Neozomus tikaderi is distributed in India.
