= Oculozomus =

Scientific classification
- Domain: Eukaryota
- Kingdom: Animalia
- Phylum: Arthropoda
- Subphylum: Chelicerata
- Class: Arachnida
- Order: Schizomida
- Family: Hubbardiidae
- Genus: Oculozomus; Reddell & Cokendolpher, 1995
- Species: O. biocellatus

Binomial name
- Oculozomus biocellatus (Sissom, 1980)

Genus of shorttailed whipscorpions

Oculozomus is a monotypic genus of hubbardiid short-tailed whipscorpions, first described by Reddell & Cokendolpher in 1995. Its single species, Oculozomus biocellatus is distributed in Indonesia (Sumatra).
