= Caribezomus =

Scientific classification
- Domain: Eukaryota
- Kingdom: Animalia
- Phylum: Arthropoda
- Subphylum: Chelicerata
- Class: Arachnida
- Order: Schizomida
- Family: Hubbardiidae
- Genus: Caribezomus; Armas, 2011
- Species: C. laurae

Binomial name
- Caribezomus laurae Armas, 2011

Genus of shorttailed whipscorpions

Caribezomus is a monotypic genus of hubbardiid short-tailed whipscorpions, first described by Luis de Armas in 2011. Its single species, Caribezomus laurae is distributed in Jamaica.
