= Zomus =

Scientific classification
- Domain: Eukaryota
- Kingdom: Animalia
- Phylum: Arthropoda
- Subphylum: Chelicerata
- Class: Arachnida
- Order: Schizomida
- Family: Hubbardiidae
- Genus: Zomus; Reddell & Cokendolpher, 1995
- Species: Z. bagnallii

Binomial name
- Zomus bagnallii (Jackson, 1908)

Genus of shorttailed whipscorpions

Zomus is a monotypic genus of hubbardiid short-tailed whipscorpions, first described by Reddell & Cokendolpher in 1995. Its single species, Zomus bagnallii is distributed in: Cook Islands, Fiji, Germany, Indonesia (Krakatau Islands), Malaysia, Mauritius (Rodrigues), Samoa, Seychelles, Singapore and Introduced into the UK.
