= Gravelyzomus =

Scientific classification
- Domain: Eukaryota
- Kingdom: Animalia
- Phylum: Arthropoda
- Subphylum: Chelicerata
- Class: Arachnida
- Order: Schizomida
- Family: Hubbardiidae
- Genus: Gravelyzomus; Kulkarni, 2012
- Species: G. chalakudicus

Binomial name
- Gravelyzomus chalakudicus (Bastawade, 2002)

Genus of shorttailed whipscorpions

Gravelyzomus is a monotypic genus of hubbardiid short-tailed whipscorpions, first described by Mandar Kulkarni in 2012. Its single species, Gravelyzomus chalakudicus is distributed in India.
