= Ovozomus =

Scientific classification
- Domain: Eukaryota
- Kingdom: Animalia
- Phylum: Arthropoda
- Subphylum: Chelicerata
- Class: Arachnida
- Order: Schizomida
- Family: Hubbardiidae
- Genus: Ovozomus; Harvey, 2001

Type species
- Ovozomus lunatus (Gravely, 1911)

Species
- 2, see text

Genus of shorttailed whipscorpions

Ovozomus is a genus of hubbardiid short-tailed whipscorpions, first described by Mark Harvey in 2001.

== Species ==
As of September 2022, the World Schizomida Catalog accepts the following two species:

- Ovozomus lunatus (Gravely, 1911) – Australia (Christmas Island), Cook Islands, India, Mayotte, Réunion, Seychelles
- Ovozomus peradeniyensis (Gravely, 1911) – Sri Lanka
