= Vinabayesius =

Scientific classification
- Domain: Eukaryota
- Kingdom: Animalia
- Phylum: Arthropoda
- Subphylum: Chelicerata
- Class: Arachnida
- Order: Schizomida
- Family: Hubbardiidae
- Genus: Vinabayesius; Teruel & Rodriguez-Cabrera, 2021

Type species
- Vinabayesius naranjoi Teruel & Rodriguez-Cabrera, 2021

Species
- 3, see text

Genus of shorttailed whipscorpions

Vinabayesius is a genus of hubbardiid short-tailed whipscorpions, first described by Teruel & Rodriguez-Cabrera in 2021.

== Species ==
As of September 2022, the World Schizomida Catalog accepts the following three species:

- Vinabayesius arenicola (Teruel, Armas & Rodríguez, 2012) – Cuba
- Vinabayesius digitiger (Dumitresco, 1977) – Cuba
- Vinabayesius naranjoi Teruel & Rodriguez-Cabrera, 2021 – Cuba
