= Calima (arachnid) =

Scientific classification
- Domain: Eukaryota
- Kingdom: Animalia
- Phylum: Arthropoda
- Subphylum: Chelicerata
- Class: Arachnida
- Order: Schizomida
- Family: Hubbardiidae
- Genus: Calima; Moreno-González & Villarreal, 2012

Type species
- Calima bremensis Moreno-González & Villarreal, 2012

Species
- 4, see text

Genus of shorttailed whipscorpions

Calima is a genus of hubbardiid short-tailed whipscorpions, first described by Moreno-González & Villarreal in 2012.

== Species ==
As of September 2022, the World Schizomida Catalog accepts the following four species:

- Calima bremensis Moreno-González & Villarreal, 2012 – Colombia
- Calima embera Moreno-González & Villarreal, 2017 – Colombia
- Calima nutabe Moreno-González & Villarreal, 2017 – Colombia
- Calima valenciorum Moreno-González & Villarreal, 2012 – Colombia
