= Artacarus =

Scientific classification
- Domain: Eukaryota
- Kingdom: Animalia
- Phylum: Arthropoda
- Subphylum: Chelicerata
- Class: Arachnida
- Order: Schizomida
- Family: Hubbardiidae
- Genus: Artacarus; Cook, 1899
- Species: A. liberiensis

Binomial name
- Artacarus liberiensis Cook, 1899

Genus of shorttailed whipscorpions

Artacarus is a monotypic genus of hubbardiid short-tailed whipscorpions, first described by Orator F. Cook in 1899. Its single species, Artacarus liberiensis is distributed in Ivory Coast and Liberia.
