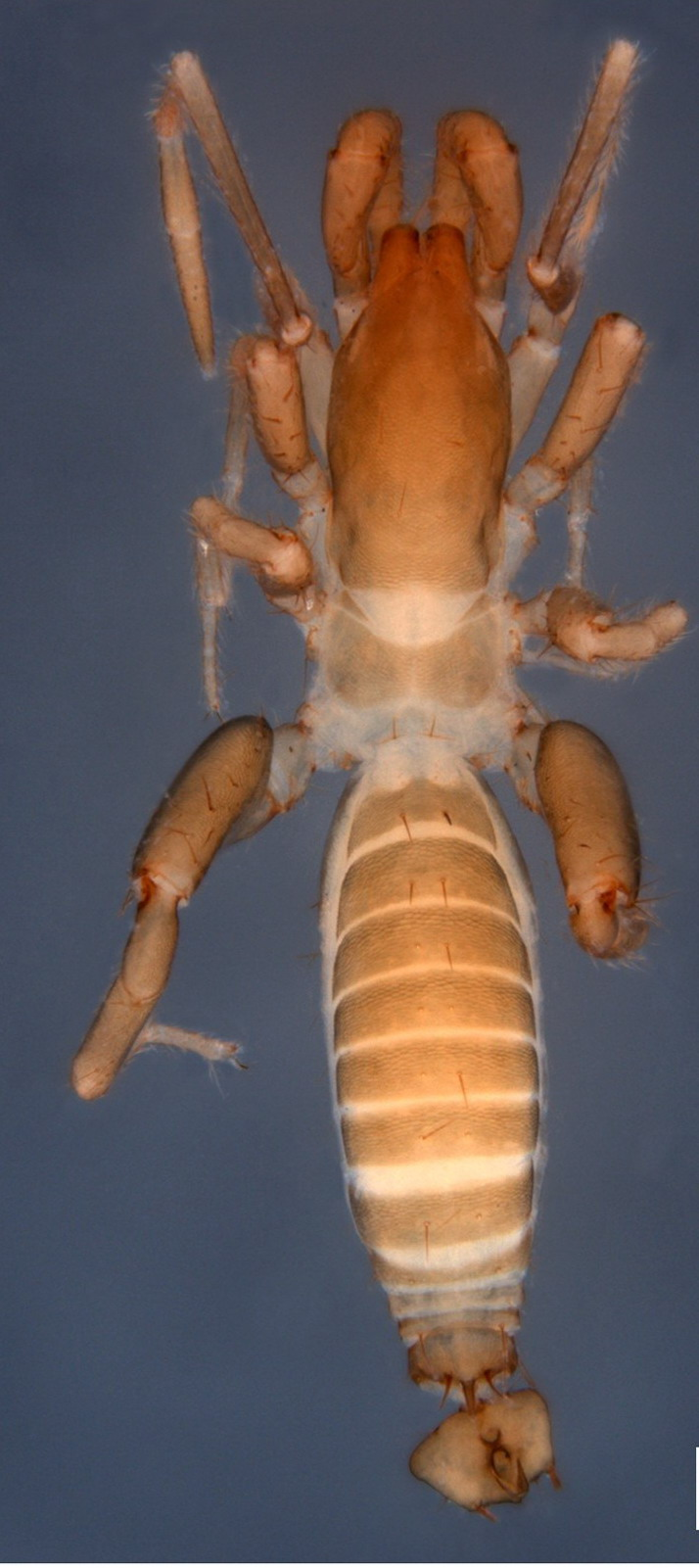
- Surazomus saturninoae male specimen

Scientific classification
- Domain: Eukaryota
- Kingdom: Animalia
- Phylum: Arthropoda
- Subphylum: Chelicerata
- Class: Arachnida
- Order: Schizomida
- Family: Hubbardiidae
- Genus: Surazomus; Cook, 1899

Type species
- Surazomus sturmi (Kraus, 1957)

Species
- 23, see text

= Surazomus =

Genus of shorttailed whipscorpions

Surazomus is a genus of hubbardiid short-tailed whipscorpions, first described by Reddell & Cokendolpher in 1995.

== Species ==
As of June 2022, the World Schizomida Catalog accepts the following twenty-three species:

- Surazomus algodoal Ruiz & Valente, 2017 – Brazil
- Surazomus antonioi Armas & Víquez, 2014 – Costa Rica
- Surazomus arboreus Cokendolpher & Reddell, 2000 – Brazil
- Surazomus boliviensis Cokendolpher & Reddell, 2000 – Bolivia
- Surazomus brasiliensis (Kraus, 1967) – Brazil
- Surazomus brus Armas, Villareal & Viquez, 2010 – Costa Rica
- Surazomus chavin Pinto-da-Rocha, 1996 – Peru
- Surazomus cuenca (Rowland & Reddell, 1979) – Ecuador
- Surazomus cumbalensis (Kraus, 1957) – Colombia
- Surazomus inexpectatus Armas, Villareal & Viquez, 2010 – Costa Rica
- Surazomus macarenensis (Kraus, 1957) – Colombia
- Surazomus manaus Cokendolpher & Reddell, 2000 – Brazil
- Surazomus mirim Cokendolpher & Reddell, 2000 – Brazil
- Surazomus nara Armas & Viquez, 2011 – Costa Rica
- Surazomus paitit Bonaldo & Pinto-da-Rocha, 2007 – Brazil
- Surazomus pallipatellatus (Rowland & Reddell, 1979) – Costa Rica
- Surazomus rafaeli Salvatierra, 2018 – Brazil
- Surazomus rodriguesi Cokendolpher & Reddell, 2000 – Brazil
- Surazomus saturninoae Ruiz & Valente, 2019 – Brazil
- Surazomus selva Armas, Villareal & Viquez, 2010 – Costa Rica
- Surazomus sturmi (Kraus, 1957) – Colombia
- Surazomus uarini Santos & Pinto-da-Rocha, 2009 – Brazil
- Surazomus vaughani Armas & Viquez, 2011 – Costa Rica
