= Sotanostenochrus =

Scientific classification
- Kingdom: Animalia
- Phylum: Arthropoda
- Subphylum: Chelicerata
- Class: Arachnida
- Order: Schizomida
- Family: Hubbardiidae
- Genus: Sotanostenochrus; Reddell & Cokendolpher, 1991

Type species
- Sotanostenochrus cookei (Rowland, 1971)

Species
- 2, see text

Genus of shorttailed whipscorpions

Sotanostenochrus is a genus of hubbardiid short-tailed whipscorpions, first described by Reddell & Cokendolpher in 1991.

== Species ==
As of January 2026, the World Schizomida Catalog accepts the following two species:

- Sotanostenochrus cookei (Rowland, 1971) – Mexico
- Sotanostenochrus mitchelli (Rowland, 1971) – Mexico
