= Reddellzomus =

Scientific classification
- Domain: Eukaryota
- Kingdom: Animalia
- Phylum: Arthropoda
- Subphylum: Chelicerata
- Class: Arachnida
- Order: Schizomida
- Family: Hubbardiidae
- Genus: Reddellzomus; Armas, 2002
- Species: R. cubensis

Binomial name
- Reddellzomus cubensis Armas, 2002

Genus of shorttailed whipscorpions

Reddellzomus is a monotypic genus of hubbardiid short-tailed whipscorpions, first described by Luis de Armas in 2002. Its single species, Reddellzomus cubensis is distributed in Cuba.
