= Heteroschizomus =

Scientific classification
- Domain: Eukaryota
- Kingdom: Animalia
- Phylum: Arthropoda
- Subphylum: Chelicerata
- Class: Arachnida
- Order: Schizomida
- Family: Hubbardiidae
- Genus: Heteroschizomus; Rowland, 1973

Type species
- Heteroschizomus goodnightorum Rowland, 1973

Species
- 4, see text

Genus of shorttailed whipscorpions

Heteroschizomus is a genus of hubbardiid short-tailed whipscorpions, first described by Jon Mark Rowland in 1973.

== Species ==
As of September 2022, the World Schizomida Catalog accepts the following four species:

- Heteroschizomus goodnightorum Rowland, 1973 – Mexico
- Heteroschizomus kekchi Monjaraz-Ruedas, Prendini & Francke, 2019 – Guatemala
- Heteroschizomus orthoplax (Rowland, 1973) – Mexico
- Heteroschizomus silvino (Rowland & Reddell, 1977) – Guatemala
