= Antillostenochrus =

Scientific classification
- Domain: Eukaryota
- Kingdom: Animalia
- Phylum: Arthropoda
- Subphylum: Chelicerata
- Class: Arachnida
- Order: Schizomida
- Family: Hubbardiidae
- Genus: Antillostenochrus; Armas & Teruel, 2002

Type species
- Antillostenochrus cokendolpheri Armas & Teruel, 2002

Species
- 13, see text

Genus of shorttailed whipscorpions

Antillostenochrus is a genus of hubbardiid short-tailed whipscorpions, first described by Armas & Teruel in 2002.

== Species ==
As of September 2022, the World Schizomida Catalog accepts the following thirteen species:

- Antillostenochrus alejandroi (Armas, 1989) – Cuba
- Antillostenochrus alticola Teruel, 2003 – Cuba
- Antillostenochrus anseli Teruel, 2015 – Cuba
- Antillostenochrus brevipatellatus (Rowland & Reddell, 1979) – Haiti
- Antillostenochrus cerdoso (Camilo & Cokendolpher, 1988) – Puerto Rico
- Antillostenochrus cokendolpheri Armas & Teruel, 2002 – Cuba
- Antillostenochrus eremita Teruel & Rodríguez-Cabrera, 2019 – Cuba
- Antillostenochrus gibarensis Armas & Teruel, 2002 – Cuba
- Antillostenochrus holguin Armas & Teruel, 2002 – Cuba
- Antillostenochrus longior Teruel, 2013 – Cuba
- Antillostenochrus planicauda Teruel, 2003 – Cuba
- Antillostenochrus subcerdoso (Armas & Abud Antun, 1990) – Dominican Republic
- †Antillostenochrus pseudoannulatus (Krüger & Dunlop, 2010) – Dominican Republic (Miocene Amber)
