= Adisomus =

Scientific classification
- Kingdom: Animalia
- Phylum: Arthropoda
- Subphylum: Chelicerata
- Class: Arachnida
- Order: Schizomida
- Family: Hubbardiidae
- Genus: Adisomus; Cokendolpher & Reddell, 2000
- Species: A. duckei

Binomial name
- Adisomus duckei Cokendolpher & Reddell, 2000

Genus of shorttailed whipscorpions

Adisomus is a monotypic genus of hubbardiid short-tailed whipscorpions, first described by Cokendolpher & Reddell in 2000. Its single species, Adisomus duckei, is distributed in Brazil.
