= Stewartpeckius =

Scientific classification
- Domain: Eukaryota
- Kingdom: Animalia
- Phylum: Arthropoda
- Subphylum: Chelicerata
- Class: Arachnida
- Order: Schizomida
- Family: Hubbardiidae
- Genus: Stewartpeckius; Reddell & Cokendolpher, 1995
- Species: S. troglobius

Binomial name
- Stewartpeckius troglobius (Rowland & Reddell, 1981)

Genus of shorttailed whipscorpions

Stewartpeckius is a monotypic genus of hubbardiid short-tailed whipscorpions, first described by Reddell & Cokendolpher in 1995. Its single species, Stewartpeckius troglobius is distributed in Jamaica.
