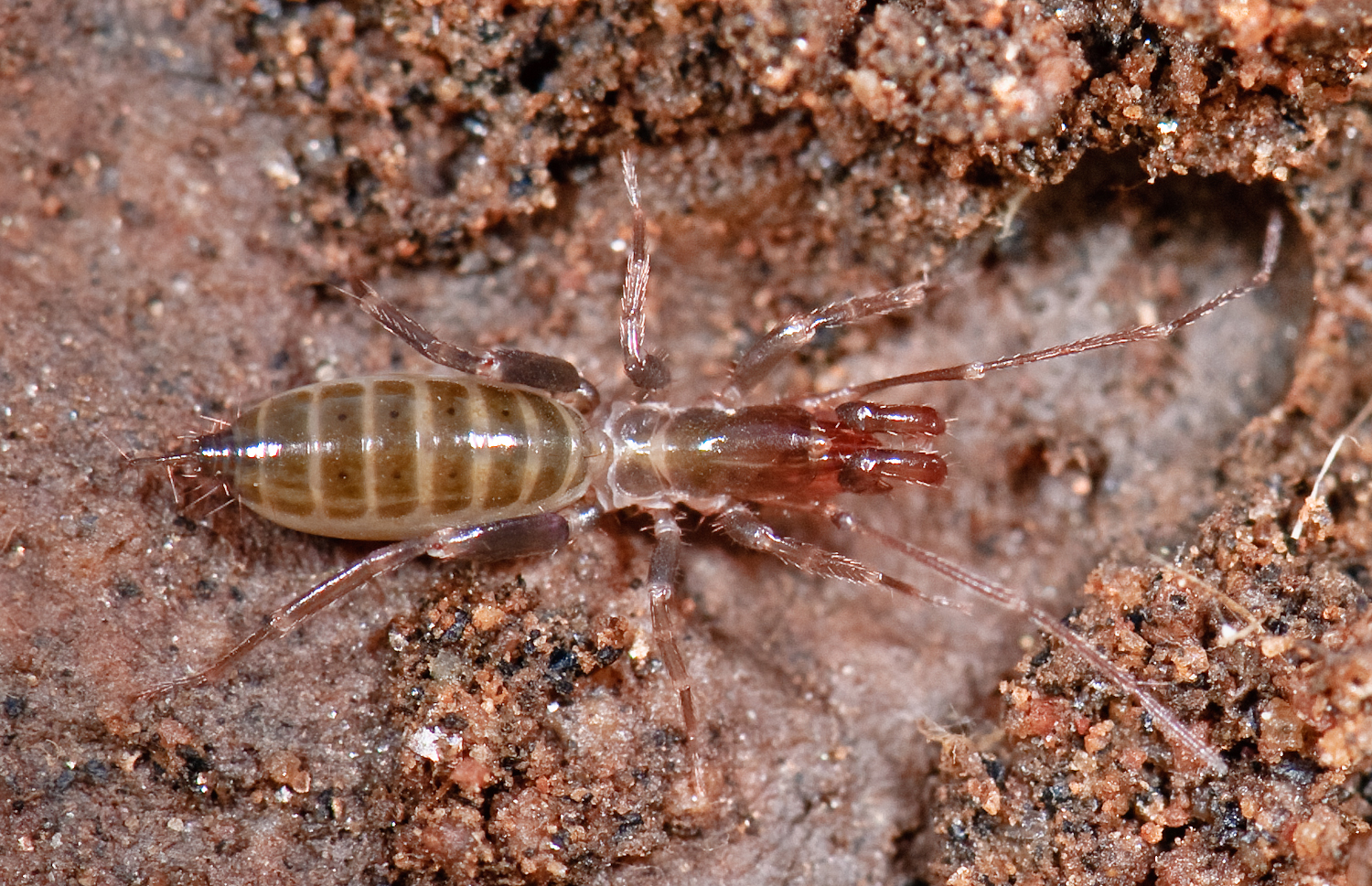

Scientific classification
- Domain: Eukaryota
- Kingdom: Animalia
- Phylum: Arthropoda
- Subphylum: Chelicerata
- Class: Arachnida
- Order: Schizomida
- Family: Hubbardiidae
- Genus: Hubbardia
- Species: H. pentapeltis

Binomial name
- Hubbardia pentapeltis Cook, 1899

= Hubbardia pentapeltis =

Species of whip scorpion

Hubbardia pentapeltis is a species of short-tailed whipscorpion in the family Hubbardiidae.

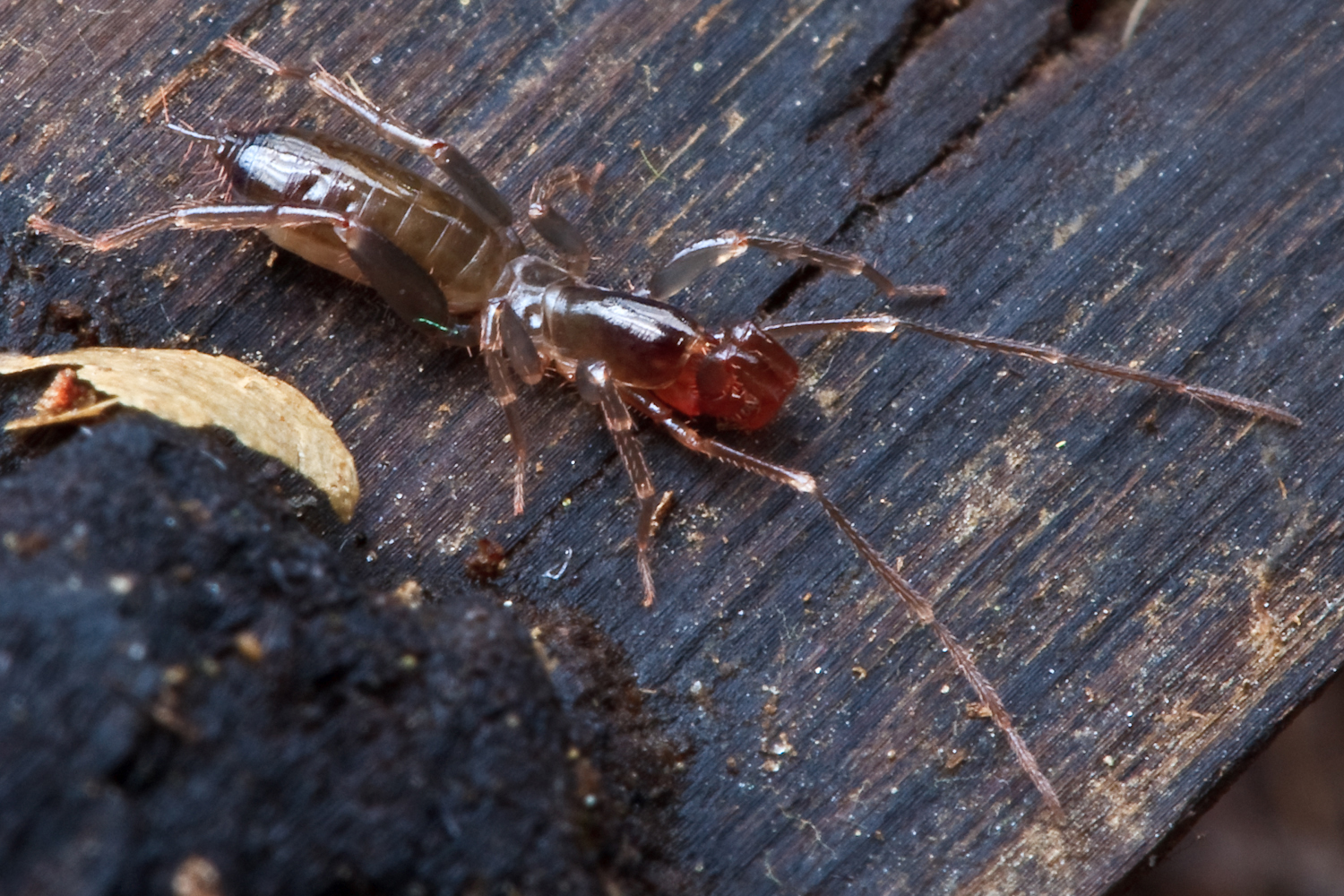

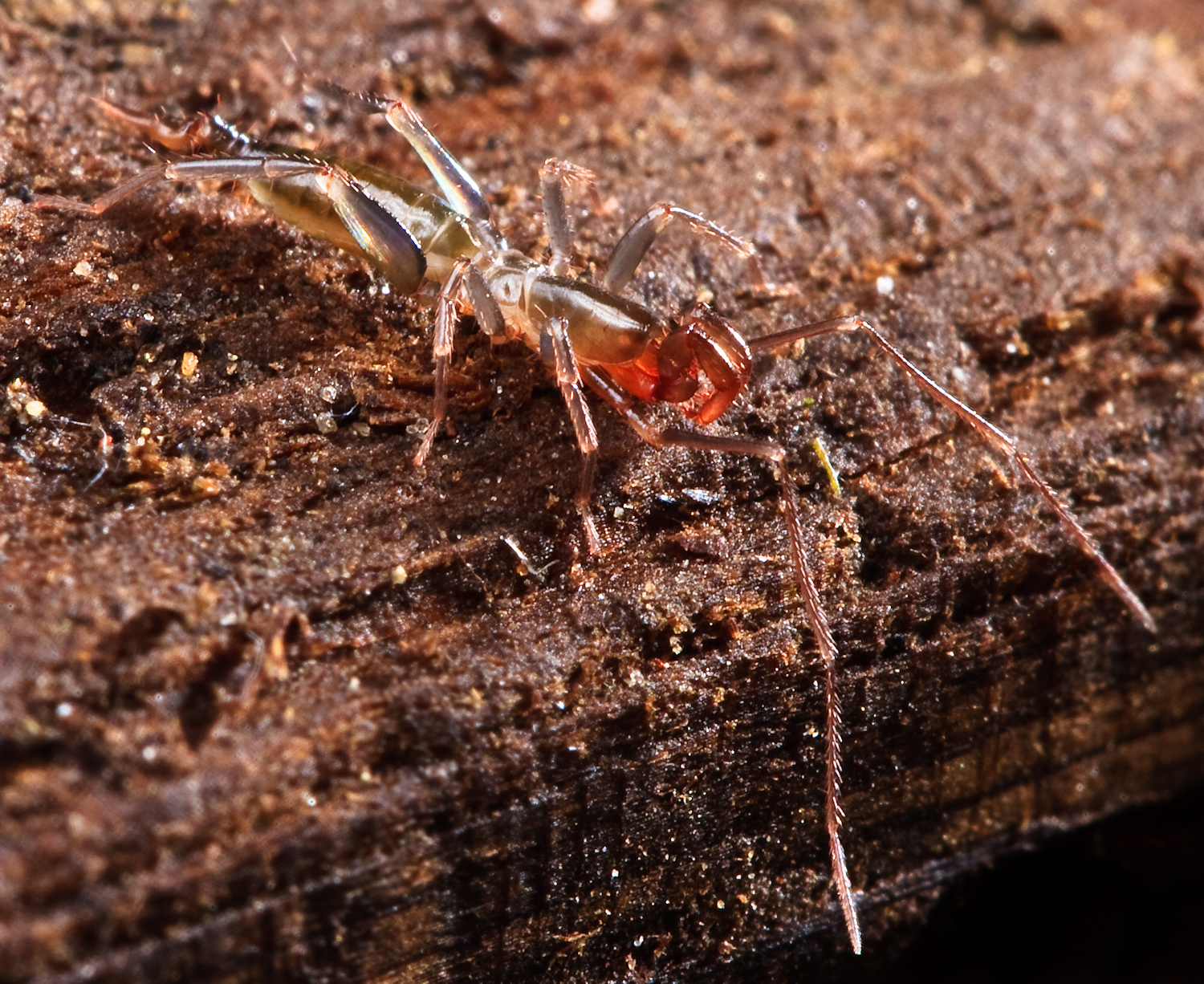
