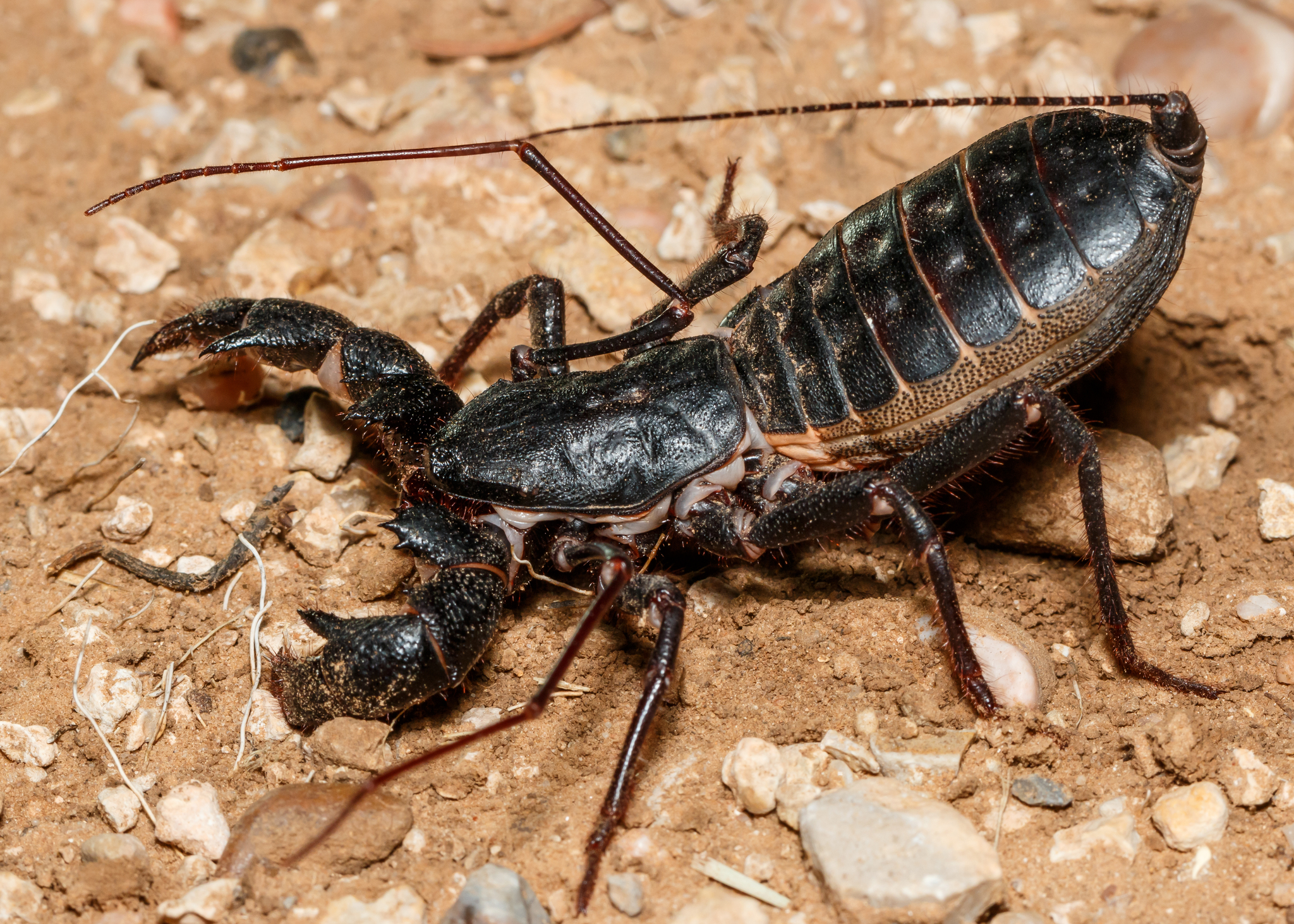
- Mastigoproctus giganteus, Uropygi
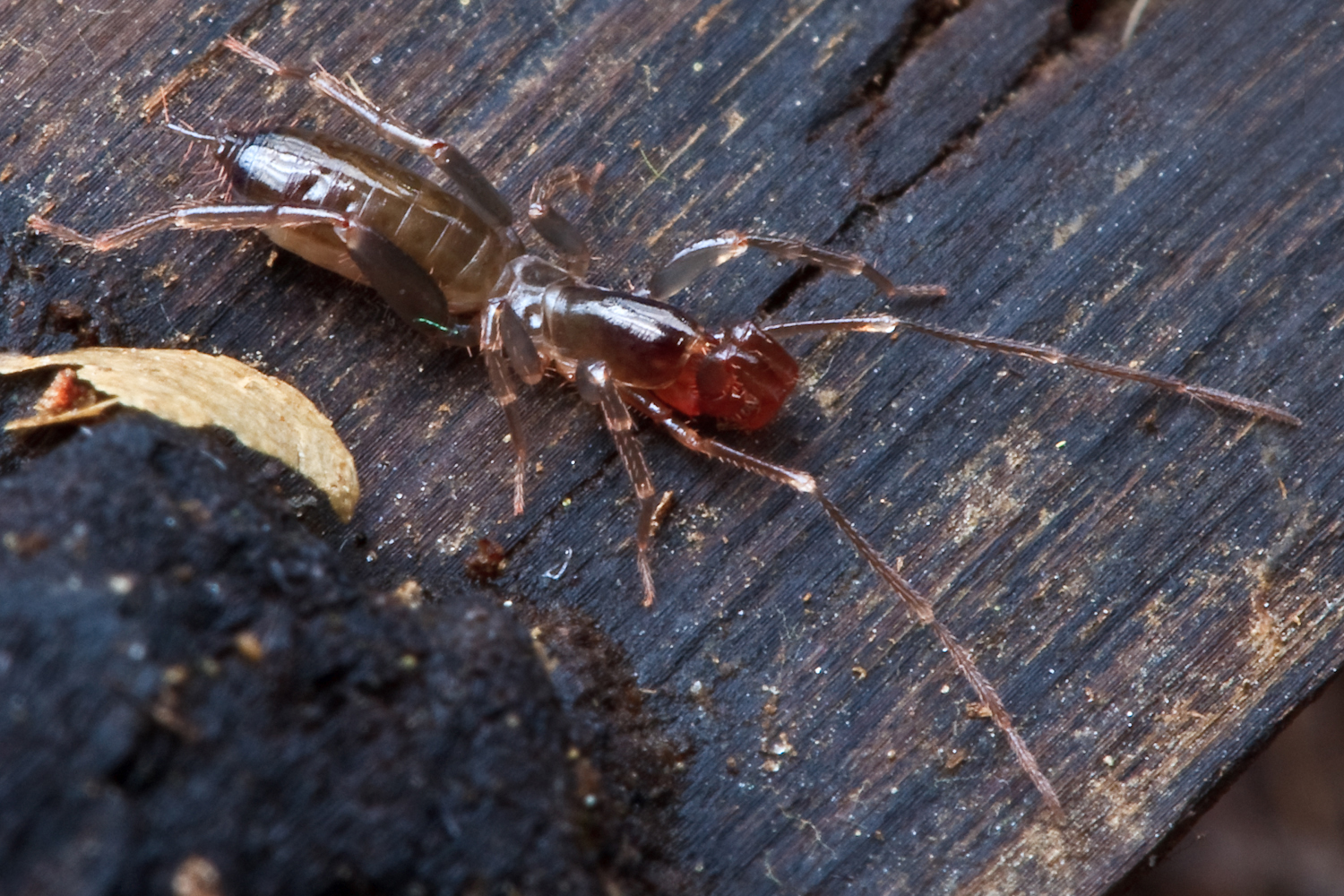
- Hubbardia pentapeltis, Schizomida

Scientific classification
- Kingdom: Animalia
- Phylum: Arthropoda
- Subphylum: Chelicerata
- Class: Arachnida
- Clade: Tetrapulmonata
- Clade: Thelyphonida

Orders
- Schizomida Petrunkevitch, 1945; Uropygi Thorell, 1882

= Thelyphonida =

Clade of arachnids

The clade Thelyphonida consists of two orders of arachnids, Uropygi (whip-scorpions) and Schizomida (short-tailed whip-scorpions). Some sources use the name Thelyphonida to refer only to whip-scorpions rather than the clade. Members of the clade Thelyphonida are mostly small arachnids. The last segment of the abdomen bears a whip-like tail or flagellum, shorter in Schizomida than Uropygi. They use only six legs for walking, the front pair being used for sensing. They are not venomous.

== Biology ==
Members of the clade Thelyphonida are mostly small, many with a body around 25–30 mm (1.0–1.2 in) long, although some can reach 85 mm (3.3 in). The opisthosoma (abdomen) is a smooth oval of 12 recognizable segments. The first is reduced and forms a pedicel, while the last three are constricted, forming the pygidium. The last segment bears a whip-like tail or flagellum, consisting of 30–40 units in whip-scorpions and no more than four segments in short-tailed whip-scorpions. They share with Amblypygi the use of their first pair of legs for tactile sensing, rather than locomotion. They do not have venom and use their spiny palps to seize prey. Features common to the clade Thelyphonida include fused palpal coxae, pygidial glands, and the first pair of legs having elongated patellae.

== Nomenclature ==
The name Thelyphonida has been used in different senses. In one system, the whip-scorpions are treated as the order Uropygi and the short-tailed whip-scorpions as order Schizomida, within the class Arachnida. This approach is followed by various taxonomic databases as of September 2025. Molecular phylogenetic studies show that the two orders are sister taxa. Thelyphonida is then the clade containing the two, with the related order Amblypygi (whip-spiders) falling outside Thelyphonida, but grouped with it as the clade Pedipalpi.

- Clade Pedipalpi
  - Order Amblypygi (whip-spiders)
  - Clade Thelyphonida
    - Order Schizomida (short-tailed whip-scorpions)
    - Order Uropygi (whip-scorpions)

Confusingly, the names Thelyphonida and Uropygi may be swapped by some sources, with whip-scorpions treated as Thelyphonida, and the parent clade of the two, if used, called Uropygi.
