= Afrozomus machadoi =

Scientific classification
- Kingdom: Animalia
- Phylum: Arthropoda
- Subphylum: Chelicerata
- Class: Arachnida
- Order: Schizomida
- Family: Hubbardiidae
- Subfamily: Hubbardiinae
- Genus: Afrozomus
- Species: A. machadoi

Binomial name
- Afrozomus machadoi Reddell & Cokendolpher, 1995

Synonyms
- Schizomus machodoi Lawrence, 1958

Species of shorttailed whipscorpions

Afrozomus machadoi is a species of arachnid belonging to the family Hubbardiidae in the order Schizomida, which are commonly known as short-tailed whip scorpions. It is the only identified species in the genus Afrozomus.

== Distribution and habitat ==
The species can be found throughout Angola and the Democratic Republic of the Congo in Africa. They live in termite mounds, which likely provide Afrozomus machadoi with its food source.
