= Agastoschizomus =

Scientific classification
- Domain: Eukaryota
- Kingdom: Animalia
- Phylum: Arthropoda
- Subphylum: Chelicerata
- Class: Arachnida
- Order: Schizomida
- Family: Protoschizomidae
- Genus: Agastoschizomus; Rowland, 1971

Type species
- Agastoschizomus lucifer Rowland, 1971

Species
- 8, see text

Genus of shorttailed whipscorpions

Agastoschizomus is a genus of protoschizomid short-tailed whipscorpions, first described by Jon Mark Rowland in 1971.

== Species ==
As of September 2022, the World Schizomida Catalog accepts the following eight species:

- Agastoschizomus huitzmolotitlensis Rowland, 1975 – Mexico
- Agastoschizomus juxtlahuacensis Moreno & Francke, 2009 – Mexico
- Agastoschizomus lucifer Rowland, 1971 – Mexico
- Agastoschizomus patei Cokendolpher & Reddell, 1992 – Mexico
- Agastoschizomus stygius Cokendolpher & Reddell, 1992 – Mexico
- Agastoschizomus tamaulipensis Monjaraz-Ruedas, Francke & Cokendolpher, 2016 – Mexico
- Agastoschizomus tenebris Monjaraz-Ruedas, Francke & Cokendolpher, 2016 – Mexico
- Agastoschizomus texanus Monjaraz-Ruedas, Francke & Cokendolpher, 2016 – US (Texas)
