= Protoschizomus =

Scientific classification
- Domain: Eukaryota
- Kingdom: Animalia
- Phylum: Arthropoda
- Subphylum: Chelicerata
- Class: Arachnida
- Order: Schizomida
- Family: Protoschizomidae
- Genus: Protoschizomus; Rowland, 1975

Type species
- Agastoschizomus pachypalpus (Rowland, 1973)

Species
- 8, see text

Genus of shorttailed whipscorpions

Protoschizomus is a genus of protoschizomid short-tailed whipscorpions, first described by Jon Mark Rowland in 1975.

== Species ==
As of September 2022, the World Schizomida Catalog accepts the following eight species:

- Protoschizomus franckei Monjaraz-Ruedas, 2013 – Mexico
- Protoschizomus gertschi Cokendolpher & Reddell, 1992 – Mexico
- Protoschizomus occidentalis Rowland, 1975 – Mexico
- Protoschizomus pachypalpus (Rowland, 1973) – Mexico
- Protoschizomus purificacion Cokendolpher & Reddell, 1992 – Mexico
- Protoschizomus rowlandi Cokendolpher & Reddell, 1992 – Mexico
- Protoschizomus sprousei Cokendolpher & Reddell, 1992 – Mexico
- Protoschizomus treacyae Cokendolpher & Reddell, 1992 – Mexico
