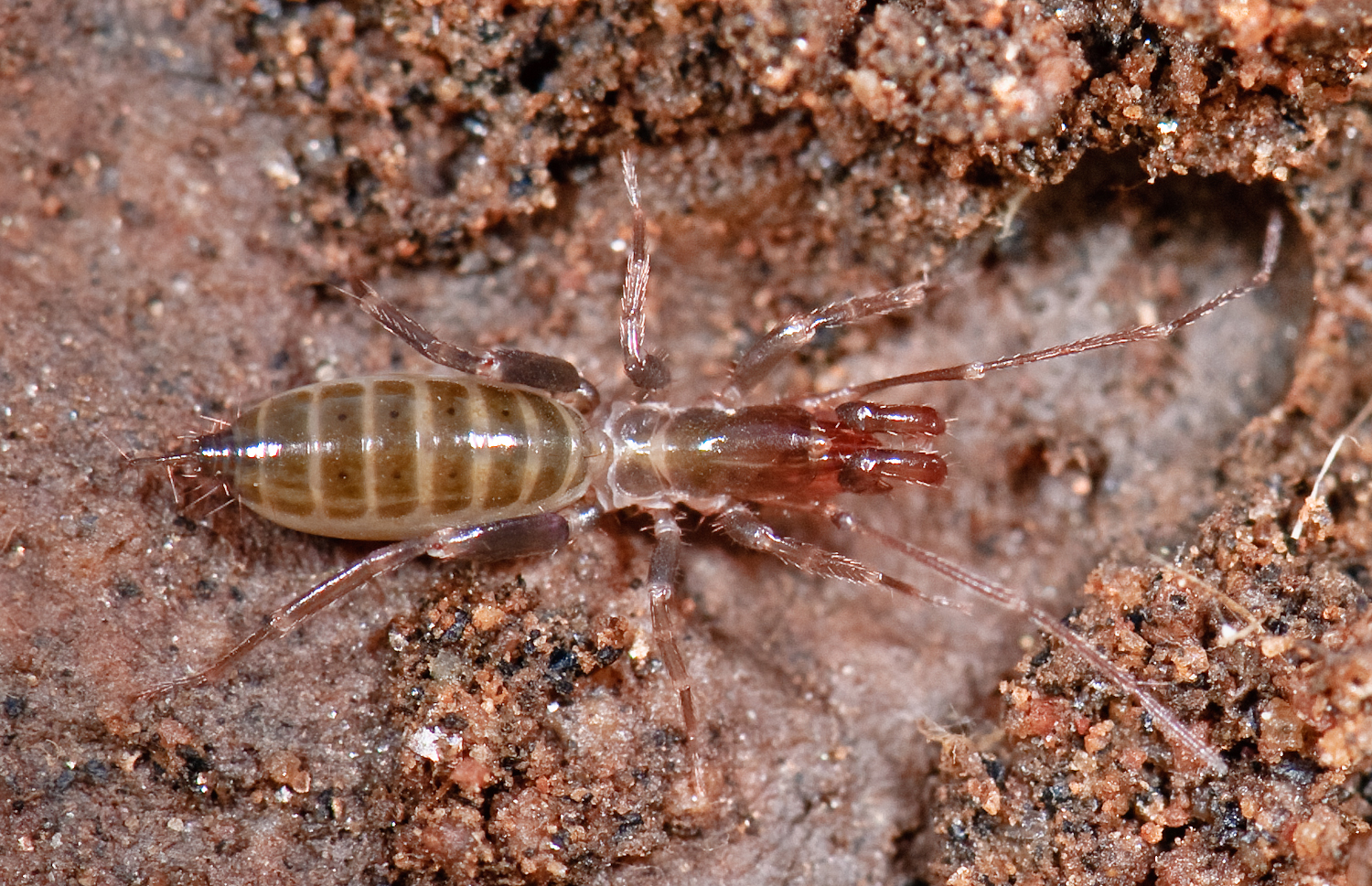
- Hubbardia pentapeltis

Scientific classification
- Domain: Eukaryota
- Kingdom: Animalia
- Phylum: Arthropoda
- Subphylum: Chelicerata
- Class: Arachnida
- Order: Schizomida
- Family: Hubbardiidae
- Subfamily: Hubbardiinae
- Genus: Hubbardia; Cook, 1899

Type species
- Hubbardia pentapeltis Cook, 1899

Species
- 9, see text

= Hubbardia (arachnid) =

Genus of whip scorpions

Hubbardia is a genus of hubbardiid short-tailed whipscorpions, first described by Orator Cook in 1899.

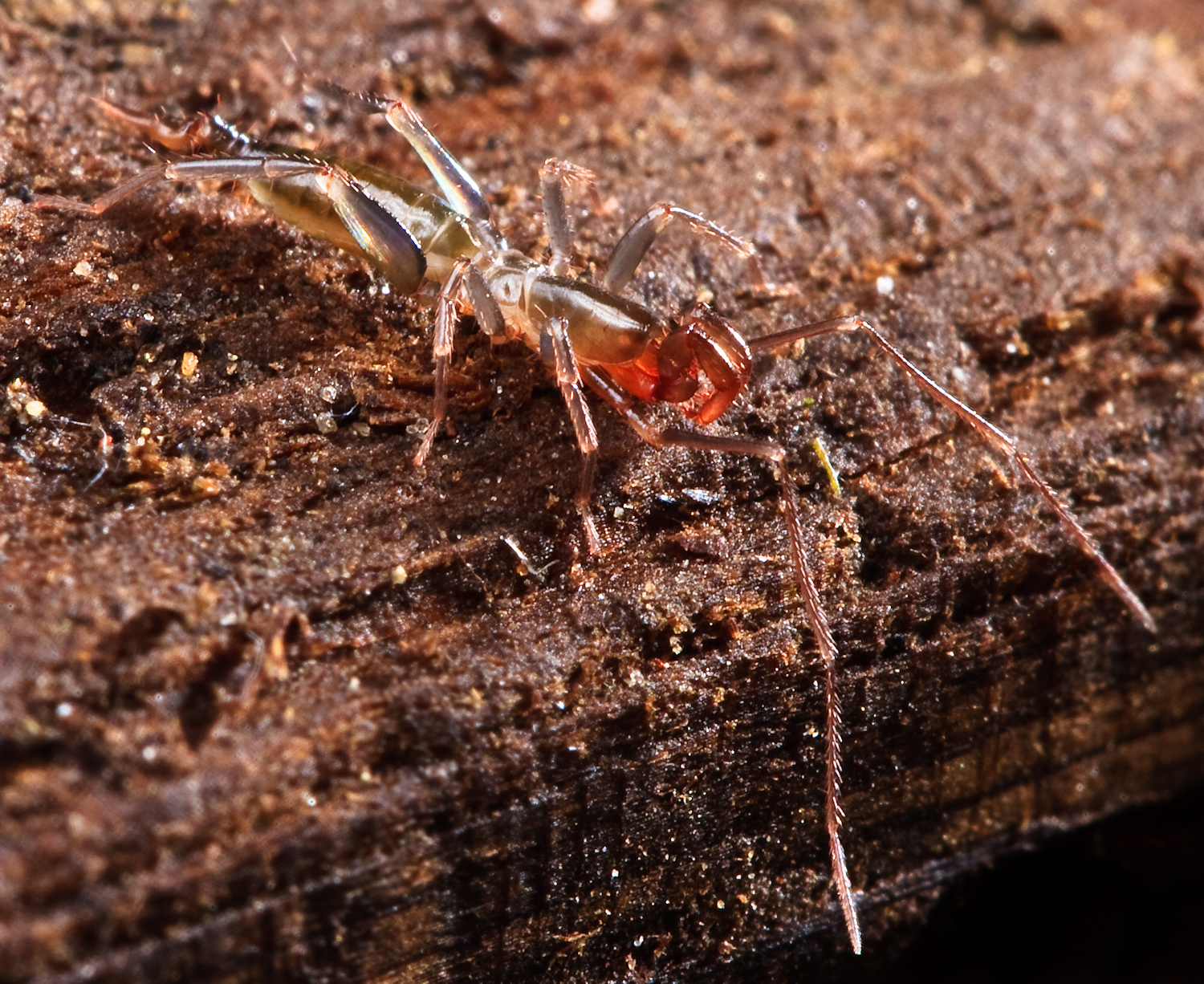
Hubbardia pentapeltis

== Species ==
As of June 2022, the World Schizomida Catalog accepts the following nine species:

- Hubbardia belkini (McDonald & Hogue, 1957) – US (California)
- Hubbardia borregoensis (Briggs & Hom, 1966) – US (California)
- Hubbardia briggsi (Rowland, 1972) – US (California)
- Hubbardia idria Reddell & Cokendolpher, 1991 – US (California)
- Hubbardia joshuensis (Rowland, 1971) – US (California)
- Hubbardia pentapeltis Cook, 1899 – US (California)
- Hubbardia secoensis (Briggs & Hom, 1988) – US (California)
- Hubbardia shoshonensis (Briggs & Hom, 1972) – US (California)
- Hubbardia wessoni (Chamberlin, 1939) – US (Arizona)
