= Baroalba Creek =

River in Northern Territory of Australia

Coordinates: 12°46′S 132°42′E

Baroalba Creek is a river in the Northern Territory, Australia.
