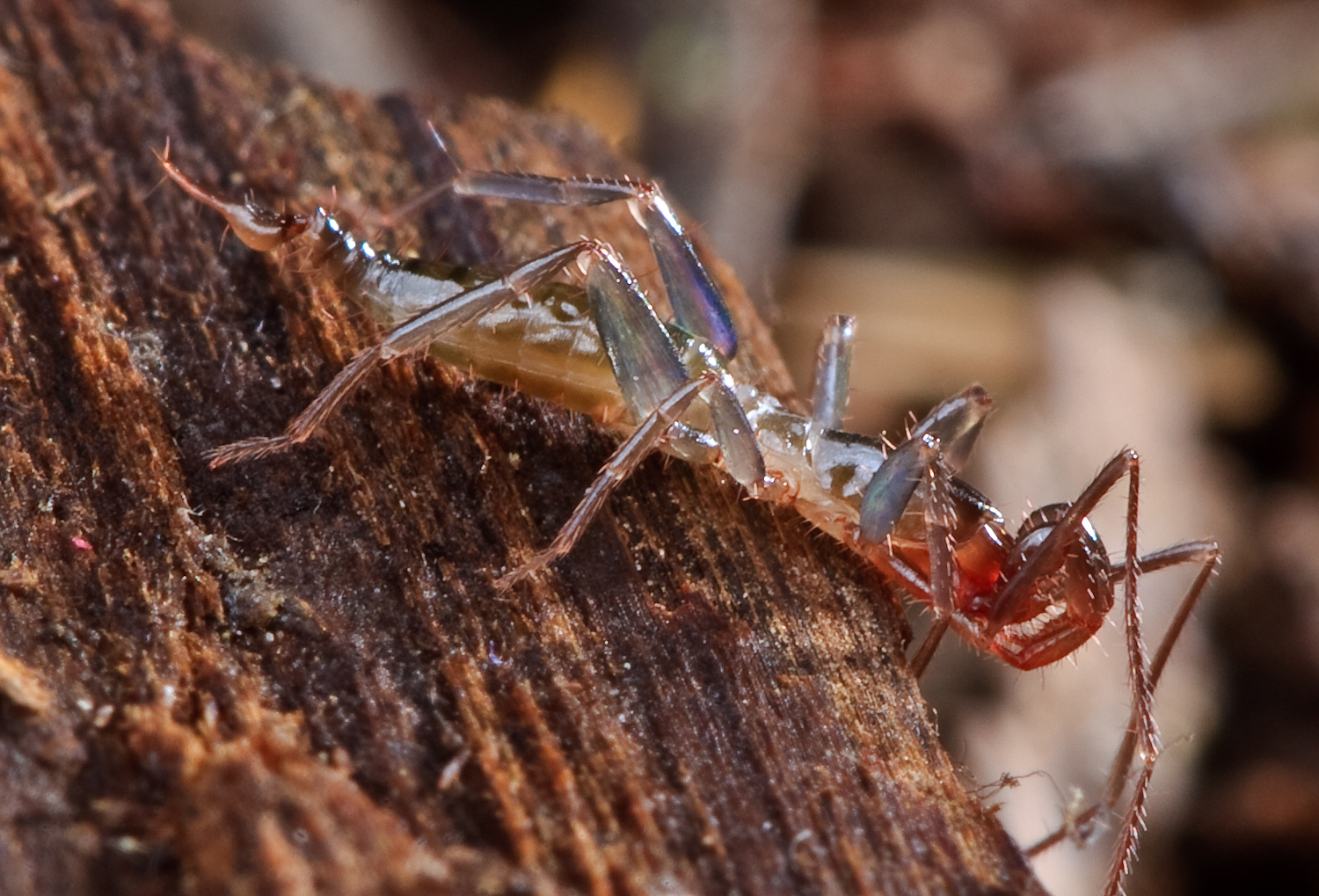
- Male Hubbardia pentapeltis

Scientific classification
- Kingdom: Animalia
- Phylum: Arthropoda
- Subphylum: Chelicerata
- Class: Arachnida
- Order: Schizomida
- Family: Hubbardiidae; Cook, 1899

Subfamilies
- Hubbardiinae Cook, 1899; Megaschizominae Rowland, 1973

= Hubbardiidae =

Hubbardiidae Temporal range: Cenomanian–Present

Family of shorttailed whipscorpions

Hubbardiidae is a family of arachnids, superficially resembling spiders. It is the larger of the two extant families of the order, Schizomida, and is divided into two subfamilies. The family is based on the description published by Orator F. Cook in 1899. The American Arachnological Society assigns the common name hubbardiid shorttailed whipscorpion to members of this family.

== Genera ==
As of September 2022, the World Schizomida Catalog accepted the following seventy-six genera:

- Adisomus Cokendolpher & Reddell, 2000
- Afrozomus Reddell & Cokendolpher, 1995
- Ambulantactus Monjaraz-Ruedas, Prendini & Francke, 2019
- Anepsiozomus Harvey, 2001
- Antillostenochrus Armas & Teruel, 2002
- Apozomus Harvey, 1992
- Artacarus Cook, 1899
- Attenuizomus Harvey, 2000
- Baalrog Monjaraz-Ruedas, Prendini & Francke, 2019
- Bamazomus Harvey, 1992
- Belicenochrus Armas & Víquez, 2010
- Brignolizomus Harvey, 2000
- Bucinozomus Armas & Rehfeldt, 2015
- Burmezomus Bastawade, 2004
- Calima Moreno-González & Villarreal, 2012
- Cangozomus Pinto-da-Rocha, Andrade, R. & Moreno-González, 2016
- Caribezomus Armas, 2011
- Clavizomus Reddell & Cokendolpher, 1995
- Cokendolpherius Armas, 2002
- Colombiazomus Armas & Delgado-Santa, 2012
- Cubacanthozomus Teruel, 2007
- Cubazomus Reddell & Cokendolpher, 1995
- Draculoides Harvey, 1992
- Dumitrescoella Teruel, 2017
- Enigmazomus Harvey, 2006
- Gravelyzomus Kulkarni, 2012
- Guanazomus Teruel & Armas, 2002
- Hansenochrus Reddell & Cokendolpher, 1995
- Harveyus Monjaraz-Ruedas, Prendini & Francke, 2019
- Heterocubazomus Teruel, 2007
- Heteroschizomus Rowland, 1973
- Hubbardia Cook, 1899
- Javazomus Reddell & Cokendolpher, 1995
- Julattenius Harvey, 1992
- Kenyazomus Armas, 2014
- Lawrencezomus Armas, 2014
- Luisarmasius Reddell & Cokendolpher, 1995
- Mahezomus Harvey, 2001
- Mayazomus Reddell & Cokendolpher, 1995
- Megaschizomus Lawrence, 1969
- Naderiore Pinto-da-Rocha, Andrade, R. & Moreno-González, 2016
- Nahual Monjaraz-Ruedas, Prendini & Francke, 2019
- Neozomus Reddell & Cokendolpher, 1995
- Notozomus Harvey, 1992
- Oculozomus Reddell & Cokendolpher, 1995
- Olmecazomus Monjaraz-Ruedas, Prendini & Francke, 2017
- Orientzomus Cokendolpher & Tsurusaki, 1994
- Ovozomus Harvey, 2001
- Pacal Reddell & Cokendolpher, 1995
- Paradraculoides Harvey, Berry, Edward & Humphreys, 2008
- Piaroa Villarreal, Giupponi & Tourinho, 2008
- Reddellzomus Armas, 2002
- Rowlandius Reddell & Cokendolpher, 1995
- Schizomus Cook, 1899
- Schizophyxia Monjaraz-Ruedas, Prendini & Francke, 2019
- Secozomus Harvey, 2001
- Siguanesiotes Teruel, 2018
- Sotanostenochrus Reddell & Cokendolpher, 1991
- Stenochrus Chamberlin, 1922
- Stenoschizomus González-Sponga, 1997
- Stewartpeckius Reddell & Cokendolpher, 1995
- Surazomus Reddell & Cokendolpher, 1995
- Tayos Reddell & Cokendolpher, 1995
- Trithyreus Kraepelin, 1899
- Troglocubazomus Teruel, 2003
- Troglostenochrus Monjaraz-Ruedas, Prendini & Francke, 2019
- Vinabayesius Teruel & Rodriguez-Cabrera, 2021
- Wayuuzomus Armas & Colmenares, 2006
- Zomus Reddell & Cokendolpher, 1995
- †Annazomus De Francesco Magnussen & Müller, 2022
- †Calcoschizomus Pierce, 1951
- †Cretaceozomus De Francesco Magnussen & Müller, 2022
- †Groehnizomus De Francesco Magnussen & Müller, 2022
- †Mesozomus Müller, Dunlop, Kotthoff, Hammel & Harms, 2019
- †Muellerizomus De Francesco Magnussen & Müller, 2022
- †Onychothelyphonus Pierce, 1950
