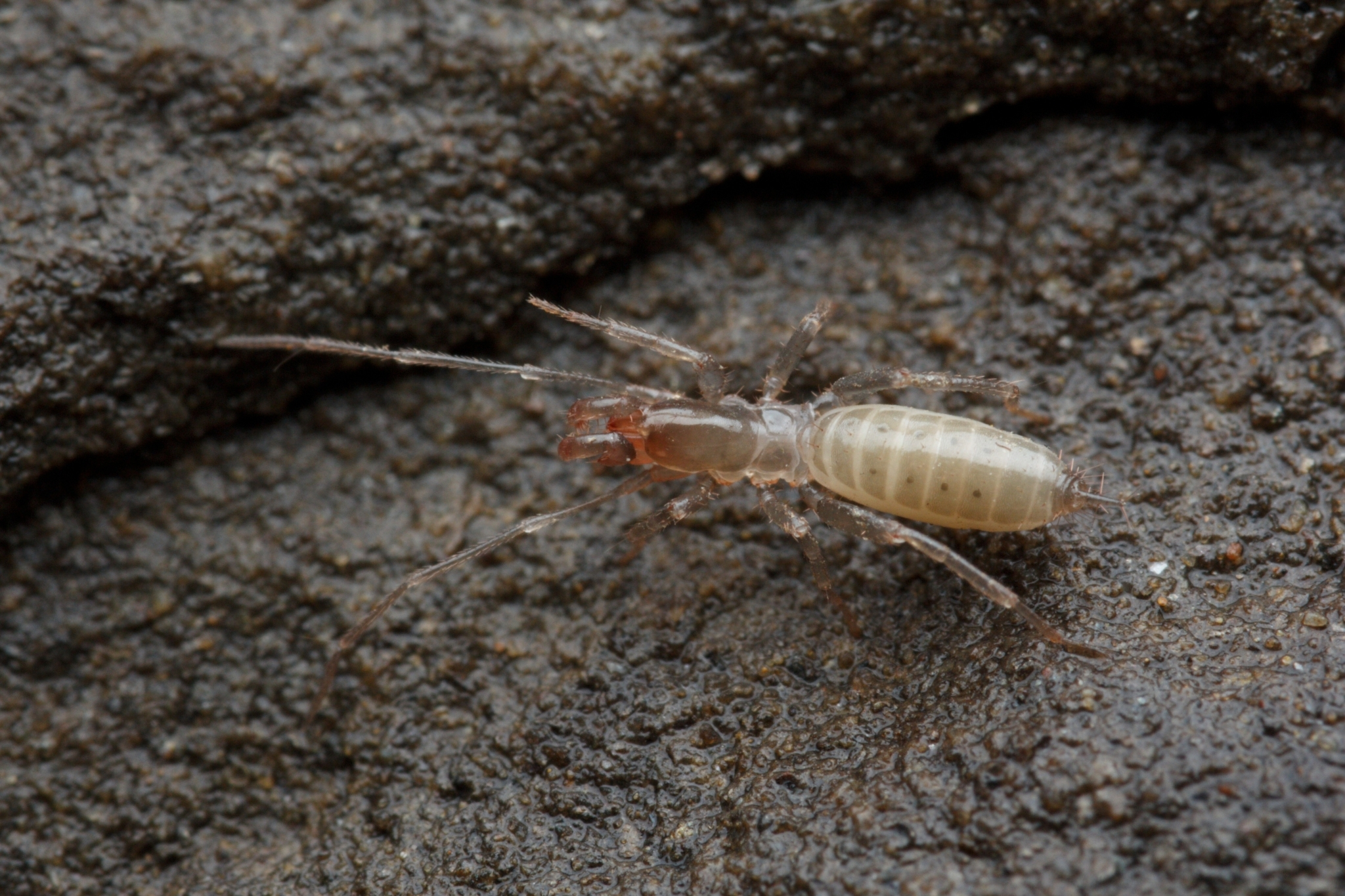
- Female Hubbardia briggsi

Scientific classification
- Kingdom: Animalia
- Phylum: Arthropoda
- Subphylum: Chelicerata
- Class: Arachnida
- Clade: Thelyphonida
- Order: Schizomida; Petrunkevitch, 1945

Families
- † Calcitronidae Petrunkevitch, 1945; Hubbardiidae Cook, 1899; Protoschizomidae Rowland, 1975

= Schizomida =

Schizomida Temporal range: Cenomanian–present

Order of arachnids

Schizomida, also known as sprickets or short-tailed whip-scorpions, is an order of arachnids, generally less than 5 millimetres (0.20 in) in length. Native to subtropical and tropical regions globally, they generally live in leaf litter and caves, where they are active predators of other arthropods.

== Taxonomy ==
Schizomids are grouped into three families:

- Calcitronidae † (fossil; dubious)
- Hubbardiidae (at least 76 genera, 275+ species)
- Protoschizomidae (2 genera, 15 species)
  - Agastoschizomus
  - Protoschizomus

About 300 species of schizomids have been described worldwide, most belonging to the Hubbardiidae family. A systematic review including a full catalogue may be found in Reddell & Cokendolpher (1995). The Schizomida is sister to the order Uropygi, the two clades together forming the Thelyphonida (in the broad sense of the name). Based on molecular clock dates, both orders likely originated in the late Carboniferous somewhere in the tropics of Pangea, and the Schizomida underwent substantial diversification starting in the Cretaceous. The oldest known unambiguous fossils of the group are from the Mid-Cretaceous (c. 100 million years ago) Burmese amber of Myanmar, which are assignable to the modern family Hubbardiidae, though Proschizomus from the late Carboniferous of England, which is much larger than living schizomids, may represent a stem member of the group.

== Morphology ==
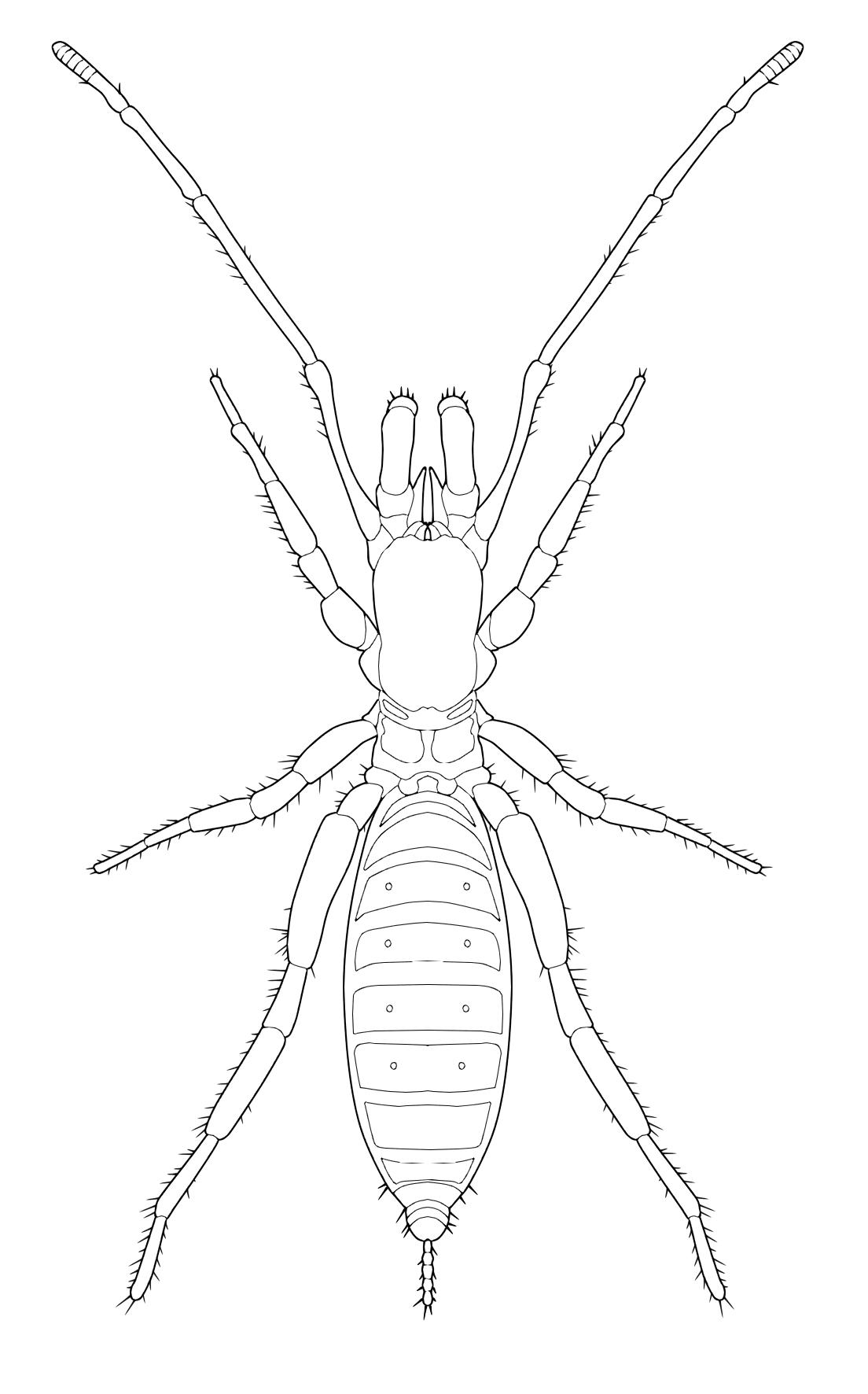
Diagram of a generalised schizomid in top-down view

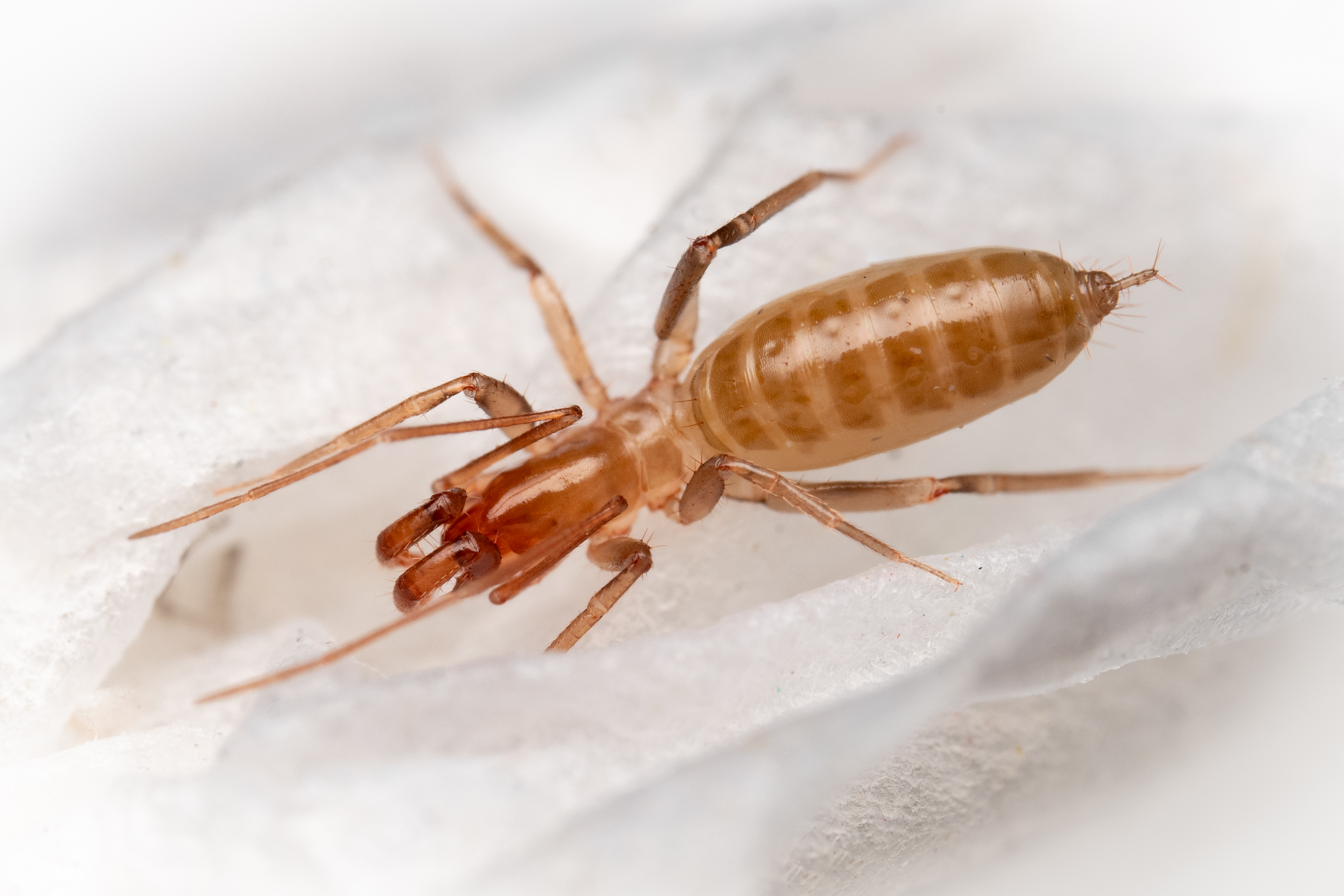
Hubbardia borregoensis

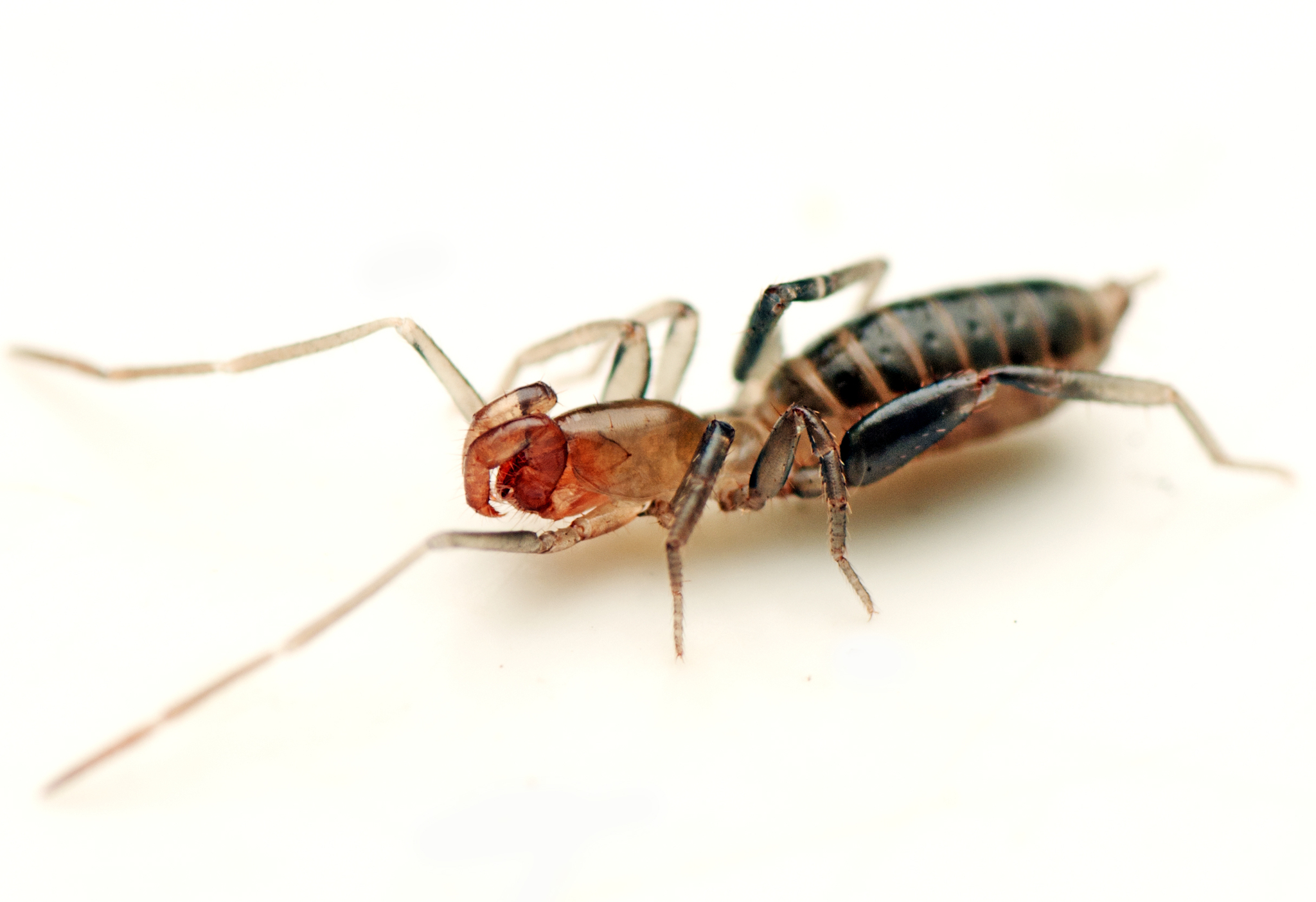
Brignolizomus woodwardi

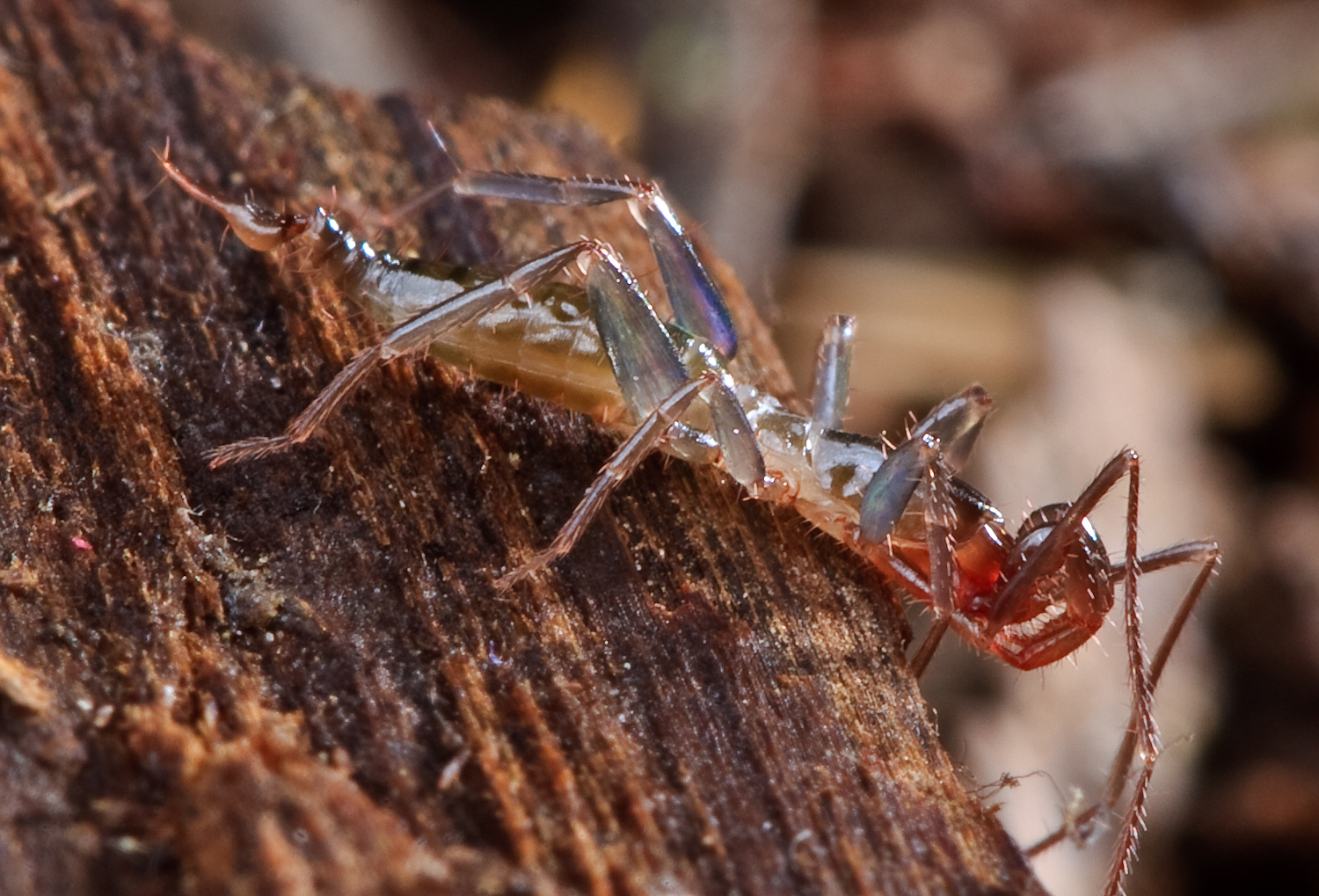
Hubbardia pentapeltis male

Schizomids are relatively small, soft-bodied arachnids, somewhat similar in appearance to whip scorpions. The prosoma (cephalothorax) is divided into three regions, each covered by plates, the large protopeltidium and the smaller, paired, mesopeltidia and metapeltidia. The name means "split or cleaved middle", referring to the way the prosoma is divided into two separate plates.

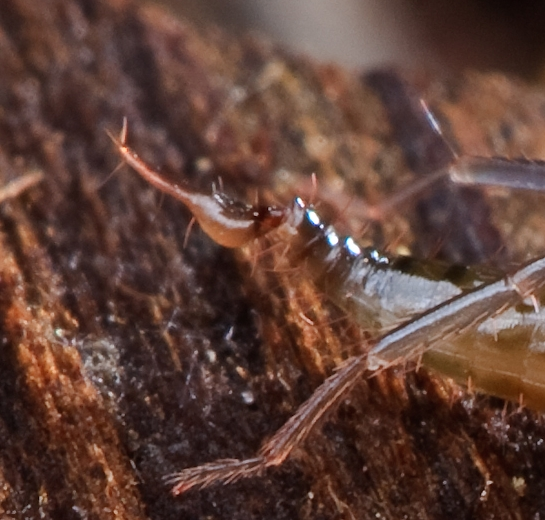
Modified flagellum of male Hubbardia pentapeltis

The opisthosoma (abdomen) is a smooth oval of 12 recognizable segments. The first is reduced and forms the pedicel, while the last three are constricted, forming the pygidium. The last segment bears a short whip-like tail or flagellum, consisting of no more than four segments. The females generally have three- or four-segmented flagella, while in males it is single segmented. The female flagellum is annulated and relatively similar across schizomids, while the male flagellum is relatively stout and un-annulated, and highly variable in form between different species.

Like the related orders Uropygi and Amblypygi, and the more distantly related Solifugae, the schizomids use only six legs for walking, having modified their first two legs to serve as sensory organs. They also have large well-developed pincer-like pedipalps just before the sensory legs. The hind legs are modified for jumping, as part of their escape response when threatened.

Schizomids have no actual eyes, but a few species have vestigial eyespots capable of telling light from dark. They breathe through a single pair of book lungs located on the second abdominal segment, as the second pair on third abdominal segment found in the other orders of Tetrapulmonata is lost.

== Distribution and habitat ==
Schizomids are generally tropical and subtropical creatures, and they have a global distribution in these habitats, including in Southeast Asia, India, Australia, several Pacific Islands, Central and South America, and Africa. Additionally, some populations have been found in neighboring temperate regions such as California and Texas. Of the two extant families of sprickets, Hubbardiidae has a global distribution while Protoschizomidae is only found in Mexico and Texas. While schizomids are not native to Europe, they have been introduced to the continent in Britain, France, the Czech Republic, and Poland via soil stock imported for botanical gardens; however, thus far they are still restricted to the artificial greenhouse environments. Despite their global distribution, most schizomid species have very restricted distributions, with many only known from their original locality.

Humidity is vital to determining the habitats in which sprickets can live as they need to avoid desiccation. They typically live in rainforest leaf litter, particularly in the top layer of organic soil, under rocks, in and beneath rotten logs, and even in caves. Although most species are restricted to rainforests, they can also be found in neighboring woody areas. The Australian species Draculoides vinei is believed to have been forced to move into a nearby humid cave system after its original forests dramatically decreased in size. Additionally, some species have been found in insect nests; Afrozomus machadoi lives in termite mounds, while Stenochrus portoricensis has been found in ant colonies. Schizomids are also occasionally found living in the trees; the South American Surazomus arboreus lives in rainforest that is seasonally flooded, forcing the arachnids to move higher into the trees to avoid drowning.

While sprickets are not typically found in colder climates, several Californian Hubbardia species have been found living under snow-covered rocks, and Hubbardia briggsi in particular is often found in snowy habitats during the winter.

== Biology ==
While not much is known about the lifespans of schizomids, they have been found to live for several months in captivity.

=== Mortality and defense ===
Not much is known about the natural predators of sprickets. Amblypygids have been observed eating schizomids. Additionally, despite their small size, schizomids have been observed being parasitized by tiny nematodes; the opisthosoma of one Stenochrus goodnightorum was nearly completely filled by a parasitic nematode.

=== Diet and feeding ===
Sprickets are active predators, constantly using their antenniform legs to examine the forest soil for potential prey. A wide range of invertebrates are prey items, including isopods, millipedes, cockroaches, worms, springtails, termites, booklice, zorapterans, and even other schizomids. Prey can range in size from 10% of their body size to as much as 100%. Once potential prey is located, the arachnid uses their antenniform legs to determine the size of the creature and note any extremities. Should the schizomid not retreat, it will lunge forward and seize its victim with its palps. The prey is then subdued, and possibly taken to the shelter of a nearby crevice to be eaten. The chelicerae dismember the prey item before the tissues are liquified into chyme and ingested via suction with the mouth.

Schizomids can survive a long time without food; some Hubbardia pentapeltis have been shown to survive five months without food.

=== Mating ===
During mating, the female grasps the flagellum (the posterior-tail-like structure) of the male with her chelicerae, simultaneously with the male attempting to move the female over his spermatophore (sperm packet) by physically dragging her forwards in a so-called "mating march" (Paarungsmarsch).
