= Ideoblothrus pisolitus =

Scientific classification
- Kingdom: Animalia
- Phylum: Arthropoda
- Subphylum: Chelicerata
- Class: Arachnida
- Order: Pseudoscorpiones
- Family: Syarinidae
- Genus: Ideoblothrus
- Species: I. pisolitus

Binomial name
- Ideoblothrus pisolitus Harvey & Edward, 2007

Species of pseudoscorpion

Ideoblothrus pisolitus is a species of pseudoscorpion in the Syarinidae family. It is endemic to Australia. It was described in 1991 by Australian arachnologists Mark Harvey and Karen Edward. The specific epithet pisolitus refers to the pisolitic geology of the type locality.

== Description ==
The body length of the male holotype is 2.25 mm; that of female paratypes 2.45-2.98 mm. The colour of the carapace and pedipalps is reddish-brown, the abdomen and legs pale tan. Eyes are absent.

== Distribution and habitat ==
The species occurs in the Pilbara region of North West Australia. The type locality is a borehole at Mesa B, 38.1 km west of the iron-ore mining town of Pannawonica.

== Behaviour ==
The pseudoscorpions are hypogean, terrestrial predators.
