= Draculoides catho =

Scientific classification
- Kingdom: Animalia
- Phylum: Arthropoda
- Subphylum: Chelicerata
- Class: Arachnida
- Order: Schizomida
- Family: Hubbardiidae
- Genus: Draculoides
- Species: D. catho

Binomial name
- Draculoides catho (Framenau, Hamilton, Finston, Humphreys, Abrams, Huey & Harvey, 2018)

Synonyms
- Paradraculoides catho Framenau et al, 2018

Species of short-tailed whip-scorpion

Draculoides catho is a species of schizomid arachnids (commonly known as sprickets or short-tailed whip-scorpions) in the Hubbardiidae family. It is endemic to Australia. It was described in 2018 by Australian arachnologists Volker Framenau, Zoë Hamilton, Terrie Finston, Garth Humphreys, Kym Abrams, Joel Huey and Mark Harvey. The specific epithet catho refers to the type locality.

== Distribution and habitat ==
The species occurs in the arid Pilbara region of North West Western Australia. The type locality is Catho Well, Mount Stuart Station, about 80 km south of the iron-ore mining town of Pannawonica and some 1,400 km north of Perth.
