= List of pseudoscorpions of Sri Lanka =

Sri Lanka is a tropical island situated close to the southern tip of India. The invertebrate fauna is as large as it is common to other regions of the world. There are about 2 million species of arthropods found in the world, and still it is counting. So many new species are discover up to this time also. So it is very complicated and difficult to summarize the exact number of species found within a certain region.

The following list provide the pseudoscorpions in Sri Lanka.

== Scorpions ==
Phylum: Arthropoda
Class: Arachnida
Order: Pseudoscorpiones

Pseudoscorpions also known as false scorpion or book scorpion, are easily identified by flat, pear-shaped body and scorpion-like pincers. There are about 3,300 species of scorpions described within 6 superfamilies and 430 genera. The studies on pseudoscorpions of Sri Lanka dated back to 1913 with the contributions of Ellingsen, who described Olpium jacobsoni. In 1930, Chamberlain described two pseudoscorpions, whereas Max Beier described Paratemnus ceylonicus in 1932. However, the first extensive study on pseudoscorpions were carried out by C. Besuchet and I. Löbl in 1970. In 1973, Beier described 16 new species, with one new genus. Beier is thus cited as the first person to make a checklist on Sri Lankan pseudoscorpions.

With thirty years of war in northern region, the diversity of fauna in northern and eastern regions reduced in greater extent. In 2011, Mark S. Harvey et al described new synonyms and genera for pseudoscorpions. The following list of pseudoscorpions of Sri Lanka compiled according to the 2014 survey by Sudesh Batuwita and Suresh P. Benjamin. According to them, Sri Lanka had 47 species with 20 endemic species, which included 15 genera.

=== Family: Chthoniidae ===
- Lagynochthonius brincki
- Tyrannochthonius heterodentatus

=== Family: Pseudotyrannochthoniidae ===
- Afrochthonius ceylonicus - Endemic
- Afrochthonius reductus - Endemic

=== Family: Feaellidae ===
- Feaella (Tetrafeaella) indica

=== Family: Hyidae ===
- Hya chamberlini - Endemic

=== Family: Ideoroncidae ===
- Nhatrangia ceylonensis - Endemic

=== Family: Syarinidae ===
- Ideoblothrus ceylonicus - Endemic

=== Family: Garypidae ===
- Garypus maldivensis

=== Family: Geogarypidae ===
- Geogarypus tenuis - Endemic
- Indogarypus ceylonicus
- Indogarypus indicus

=== Family: Olpiidae ===
- Calocheiridius mussardi - Endemic
- Indolpium loyolae
- Minniza ceylonica - Endemic
- Olpium ceylonicum - Endemic
- Olpium jacobsoni

=== Family: Sternophoridae ===
- Afrosternophorus ceylonicus

=== Family: Cheiridiidae ===
- Cryptocheiridium sp.

=== Family: Atemnidae ===
- Anatemnus javanus
- Anatemnus nilgiricus
- Anatemnus orites
- Micratemnus anderssoni - Endemic
- Micratemnus ceylonicus
- Micratemnus sp.
- Oratemnus indicus
- Oratemnus loyolai
- Oratemnus navigator
- Oratemnus proximus
- Paratemnoides pallidus
- Stenatemnus brincki

=== Family: Cheliferidae ===
- Lissochelifer depressoides
- Lophochernes cederholmi
- Lophochernes ceylonicus - Endemic
- Mucrochelifer borneoensis
- Telechelifer lophonotus - Endemic

=== Family: Chernetidae ===
- Ceriochernes besucheti - Endemic
- Haplochernes warburgi
- Parachernes (Parachernes) cocophilus
- Parachernes (Parachernes) indicus
- Parapilanus ceylonicus - Endemic
- Verrucachernes oca
- Verrucachernes aff. oca
- Lamprochernes nodosus
- Megachernes kanneliyensis - Endemic

=== Family: Withiidae ===
- Withius ceylanicus - Endemic
- Withius piger
