= Draculoides affinis =

Scientific classification
- Kingdom: Animalia
- Phylum: Arthropoda
- Subphylum: Chelicerata
- Class: Arachnida
- Order: Schizomida
- Family: Hubbardiidae
- Genus: Draculoides
- Species: D. affinis

Binomial name
- Draculoides affinis (Framenau, Hamilton, Finston, Humphreys, Abrams, Huey & Harvey, 2018)

Synonyms
- Paradraculoides affinis Framenau et al, 2018

Species of short-tailed whip-scorpion

Draculoides affinis is a species of schizomid arachnids (commonly known as sprickets or short-tailed whip-scorpions) in the Hubbardiidae family. It is endemic to Australia. It was described in 2018 by Australian arachnologists Volker Framenau, Zoë Hamilton, Terrie Finston, Garth Humphreys, Kym Abrams, Joel Huey and Mark Harvey. The specific epithet affinis is Latin for ‘related to’ or ‘neighbouring’, with reference to its similarity to other species in the genus.

== Distribution and habitat ==
The species occurs in the arid Pilbara region of North West Western Australia. The type locality is Cane and Upper Cane River, about 60 km south of the iron-ore mining town of Pannawonica and some 1,400 km north of Perth.
