= Draculoides obrutus =

Scientific classification
- Kingdom: Animalia
- Phylum: Arthropoda
- Subphylum: Chelicerata
- Class: Arachnida
- Order: Schizomida
- Family: Hubbardiidae
- Genus: Draculoides
- Species: D. obrutus

Binomial name
- Draculoides obrutus (Framenau, Hamilton, Finston, Humphreys, Abrams, Huey & Harvey, 2018)

Synonyms
- Paradraculoides obrutus Framenau et al, 2018

Species of short-tailed whip-scorpion

Draculoides obrutus is a species of schizomid arachnids (commonly known as sprickets or short-tailed whip-scorpions) in the Hubbardiidae family. It is endemic to Australia. It was described in 2018 by Australian arachnologists Volker Framenau, Zoë Hamilton, Terrie Finston, Garth Humphreys, Kym Abrams, Joel Huey and Mark Harvey. The specific epithet obrutus (Latin: ‘buried’ or ‘hidden’) refers to the species only being discovered through molecular analysis.

== Distribution and habitat ==
The species occurs in the arid Pilbara region of North West Western Australia. The type locality is Kens Bore, about 50 km (31 mi) south of the iron-ore mining town of Pannawonica and some 1,400 km (870 mi) north of Perth.
