= Draculoides mesozeirus =

Scientific classification
- Kingdom: Animalia
- Phylum: Arthropoda
- Subphylum: Chelicerata
- Class: Arachnida
- Order: Schizomida
- Family: Hubbardiidae
- Genus: Draculoides
- Species: D. mesozeirus

Binomial name
- Draculoides mesozeirus Harvey, Berry, Edward & Humphreys, 2008

Species of short-tailed whip-scorpion

Draculoides mesozeirus is a species of schizomid arachnids (commonly known as short-tailed whip-scorpions) in the Hubbardiidae family. It is endemic to Australia. It was described in 2008 by Australian arachnologists Mark Harvey, Oliver Berry, Karen Edward and Garth Humphreys. The specific epithet mesozeirus, from Greek mesos (‘middle’) and zeira (‘robe’), refers to the type locality.

== Distribution and habitat ==
The species occurs in the Pilbara region of North West Western Australia where there is underground water. The type locality is a borehole at the Middle Robe mesa, 23.5 km east of the iron-ore mining town of Pannawonica and 1,400 km north of Perth.
