= Draculoides confusus =

Scientific classification
- Kingdom: Animalia
- Phylum: Arthropoda
- Subphylum: Chelicerata
- Class: Arachnida
- Order: Schizomida
- Family: Hubbardiidae
- Genus: Draculoides
- Species: D. confusus

Binomial name
- Draculoides confusus (Framenau, Hamilton, Finston, Humphreys, Abrams, Huey & Harvey, 2018)

Synonyms
- Paradraculoides confusus Framenau et al, 2018

Species of short-tailed whip-scorpion

Draculoides confusus is a species of schizomid arachnids (commonly known as sprickets or short-tailed whip-scorpions) in the Hubbardiidae family. It is endemic to Australia. It was described in 2018 by Australian arachnologists Volker Framenau, Zoë Hamilton, Terrie Finston, Garth Humphreys, Kym Abrams, Joel Huey and Mark Harvey. The specific epithet confusus (Latin for ‘confused’) refers to the shared diagnostic characters of Draculoides and Paradraculoides.

== Distribution and habitat ==
The species occurs in the arid Pilbara region of North West Western Australia. The type locality is Trinity Bore, about 76 km south of the iron-ore mining town of Pannawonica and some 1,400 km north of Perth.
