= Draculoides eremius =

Scientific classification
- Kingdom: Animalia
- Phylum: Arthropoda
- Subphylum: Chelicerata
- Class: Arachnida
- Order: Schizomida
- Family: Hubbardiidae
- Genus: Draculoides
- Species: D. eremius

Binomial name
- Draculoides eremius (Abrams & Harvey, 2015)

Synonyms
- Paradraculoides eremius Abrams & Harvey, 2015

Species of short-tailed whip-scorpion

Draculoides eremius is a species of schizomid arachnids (commonly known as short-tailed whip-scorpions) in the Hubbardiidae family. It is endemic to Australia. It was described in 2015 by Australian arachnologists Kym Abrams and Mark Harvey. The specific epithet eremius, from the Greek for ‘solitude’ or ‘desert’, refers to its solitary underground existence.

== Description ==
The male holotype has a body length of 4.30 mm; the female paratype of 3.29 mm. The colour ranges from yellow-brown to dark orange-brown.

== Distribution and habitat ==
The species occurs in the arid Pilbara region of North West Western Australia, where it has only been found in subterranean habitats in channel-iron deposits. The type locality is Bungaroo, 35.4 km south-east of the iron-ore mining town of Pannawonica and some 1,400 km north of Perth.

== Behaviour ==
The arachnids are troglofaunal predators.
