= Indohya beieri =

Scientific classification
- Kingdom: Animalia
- Phylum: Arthropoda
- Subphylum: Chelicerata
- Class: Arachnida
- Order: Pseudoscorpiones
- Family: Hyidae
- Genus: Indohya
- Species: I. beieri

Binomial name
- Indohya beieri Harvey, 1993

Species of pseudoscorpion

Indohya beieri is a species of pseudoscorpion in the Hyidae family. It is endemic to Australia. It was described in 1993 by Australian arachnologist Mark Harvey.

== Distribution and habitat ==
The species occurs in the Kimberley region of North West Australia. The type locality is 3.4 km south-west of Manning Creek, Prince Frederick Harbour.

== Behaviour ==
The pseudoscorpions are terrestrial predators that inhabit plant litter.
