= Anysrius chamberlini =

Scientific classification
- Kingdom: Animalia
- Phylum: Arthropoda
- Subphylum: Chelicerata
- Class: Arachnida
- Order: Pseudoscorpiones
- Family: Syarinidae
- Genus: Anysrius
- Species: A. chamberlini

Binomial name
- Anysrius chamberlini Harvey, 1998

Species of pseudoscorpion

Anysrius chamberlini is a species of pseudoscorpion in the Hyidae family. It is endemic to Australia. It was described in 1998 by Australian arachnologist Mark Harvey. The specific epithet chamberlini honours American arachnologist Joseph Conrad Chamberlin.

== Description ==
The body length of the holotype male is 1.570 mm; that of the paratype female is 1.920 mm. The carapace and pedipalps are reddish-brown; the rest of the body paler.

== Distribution and habitat ==
The species occurs in South West Tasmania. The type locality is Frodsham's Pass, where the holotype was found in temperate rainforest dominated by Nothofagus.

== Behaviour ==
The pseudoscorpions are terrestrial predators that inhabit plant litter.
