= Draculoides anachoretus =

Scientific classification
- Kingdom: Animalia
- Phylum: Arthropoda
- Subphylum: Chelicerata
- Class: Arachnida
- Order: Schizomida
- Family: Hubbardiidae
- Genus: Draculoides
- Species: D. anachoretus

Binomial name
- Draculoides anachoretus (Harvey, Berry, Edward & Humphreys, 2008)

Synonyms
- Paradraculoides anachoretus Harvey, Berry, Edward & Humphreys, 2008

Species of short-tailed whip-scorpion

Draculoides anachoretus is a species of schizomid arachnids (commonly known as short-tailed whip-scorpions) in the Hubbardiidae family. It is endemic to Australia. It was described in 2008 by Australian arachnologists Mark Harvey, Oliver Berry, Karen Edward and Garth Humphreys. The specific epithet anachoretus, from Greek anachoretes (‘hermit’ or ‘recluse’), refers to the species’ subterranean habitat.

== Distribution and habitat ==
The species occurs in the Pilbara region of North West Western Australia where there is underground water. The type locality is a borehole at Mesa A, some 45 km west of the iron-ore mining town of Pannawonica and 1,400 km north of Perth.
