= Ideoblothrus descartes =

Scientific classification
- Kingdom: Animalia
- Phylum: Arthropoda
- Subphylum: Chelicerata
- Class: Arachnida
- Order: Pseudoscorpiones
- Family: Syarinidae
- Genus: Ideoblothrus
- Species: I. descartes

Binomial name
- Ideoblothrus descartes Harvey & Edward, 2007

Species of pseudoscorpion

Ideoblothrus descartes is a species of pseudoscorpion in the Syarinidae family. It is endemic to Australia. It was described in 1991 by Australian arachnologists Mark Harvey and Karen Edward. The specific epithet descartes refers to the type locality.

== Description ==
The body length of the male holotype is 1.82 mm; that of a paratype female is 1.74 mm. The colour is mainly pale yellow, with the pedipalps red-orange, and the carapace, chelicerae and coxae yellow orange.

== Distribution and habitat ==
The species occurs in the Kimberley region of North West Australia. The type locality is beneath rocks, near a freshwater seep in vine thicket habitat, on Descartes Island, at the mouth of Admiralty Gulf.

== Behaviour ==
The pseudoscorpions are terrestrial predators.
