= Indohya humphreysi =

Scientific classification
- Kingdom: Animalia
- Phylum: Arthropoda
- Subphylum: Chelicerata
- Class: Arachnida
- Order: Pseudoscorpiones
- Family: Hyidae
- Genus: Indohya
- Species: I. humphreysi

Binomial name
- Indohya humphreysi (Harvey, 1993)

Synonyms
- Hyella humphreysi Harvey, 1993

Species of pseudoscorpion

Indohya humphreysi is a species of pseudoscorpion in the Hyidae family. It is endemic to Australia. It was described in 1993 by Australian arachnologist Mark Harvey.

== Distribution and habitat ==
The species occurs in North West Australia. The type locality is Papillon Cave (C-15) in the Cape Range.

== Behaviour ==
The pseudoscorpions are cave-dwelling terrestrial predators.
