= Indohya damocles =

Scientific classification
- Kingdom: Animalia
- Phylum: Arthropoda
- Subphylum: Chelicerata
- Class: Arachnida
- Order: Pseudoscorpiones
- Family: Hyidae
- Genus: Indohya
- Species: I. damocles

Binomial name
- Indohya damocles Harvey & Volschenk, 2007

Species of pseudoscorpion

Indohya damocles is a species of pseudoscorpion in the Hyidae family. It is endemic to Australia. It was described in 2007 by arachnologists Mark Harvey and Erich Volschenk.

== Distribution and habitat ==
The species occurs in North West Australia. The type locality is Camerons Cave (C-452) in the Cape Range. The holotype was found in the dark zone, beneath a rock in the calcite pool chamber.

== Behaviour ==
The pseudoscorpions are cave-dwelling terrestrial predators.
