= Indohya panops =

Scientific classification
- Kingdom: Animalia
- Phylum: Arthropoda
- Subphylum: Chelicerata
- Class: Arachnida
- Order: Pseudoscorpiones
- Family: Hyidae
- Genus: Indohya
- Species: I. panops

Binomial name
- Indohya panops Harvey, 1993

Species of pseudoscorpion

Indohya panops is a species of pseudoscorpion in the Hyidae family. It is endemic to Australia. It was described in 1993 by Australian arachnologist Mark Harvey.

== Distribution and habitat ==
The species occurs in the Kimberley region of North West Australia. The type locality is 13.5 km north-east of Crystal Head, in closed forest on South West Osborn Island.

== Behaviour ==
The pseudoscorpions are terrestrial predators which inhabit plant litter.
