= Kangaraneus =

Scientific classification
- Kingdom: Animalia
- Phylum: Arthropoda
- Subphylum: Chelicerata
- Class: Arachnida
- Order: Araneae
- Infraorder: Araneomorphae
- Family: Araneidae
- Subfamily: Araneinae
- Genus: Kangaraneus; Castanheira & Framenau, 2023

Type species
- Epeira arenacea Keyserling, 1886

Species
- 3, see text

Genus of spiders

Kangaraneus is a genus of spiders in the family Araneidae.

== Distribution ==
Kangaraneus is endemic to Australia, with species distributed across multiple states and territories.

== Etymology ==
The genus name is a combination of "kangaroo" (genus Macropus), indicating the Australian origin, and the spider genus Araneus.

== Taxonomy ==
Two species previously in Araneus and one new were combined into this genus. Males of this genus are most similar to Quokkaraneus.

== Species ==
As of November 2026, this genus includes three species:

- Kangaraneus amblycyphus (Simon, 1908) – Australia (Western Australia, South Australia, Queensland, New South Wales, Capital Territory, Victoria)
- Kangaraneus arenaceus (Keyserling, 1886) – Australia (Western Australia, South Australia, Queensland, New South Wales, Victoria) (type species)
- Kangaraneus farhani Castanheira & Framenau, 2023 – Australia (South Australia, New South Wales, Capital Territory, Victoria, Tasmania)
