= Ideoblothrus linnaei =

Scientific classification
- Kingdom: Animalia
- Phylum: Arthropoda
- Subphylum: Chelicerata
- Class: Arachnida
- Order: Pseudoscorpiones
- Family: Syarinidae
- Genus: Ideoblothrus
- Species: I. linnaei

Binomial name
- Ideoblothrus linnaei Harvey & Leng, 2008

Species of pseudoscorpion

Ideoblothrus linnaei is a species of pseudoscorpion in the Syarinidae family. It is endemic to Australia. It was described in 1991 by Australian arachnologists Mark Harvey and Mei Chen Leng. The specific epithet linnaei honours Swedish taxonomist Carl Linnaeus (1707-1778), to mark the 250th anniversary of the publication of the 10th edition of his Systema Naturae.

== Description ==
The body length of the holotype male is 1.16 mm. The colour of the pedipalps and carapace is pale reddish-brown, the abdomen and legs pale tan. Eyes are absent.

== Distribution and habitat ==
The species occurs in the Pilbara region of North West Australia]]. The type locality is Mesa A, some 50 km west of the iron-ore mining town of Pannawonica.

== Behaviour ==
The pseudoscorpions are hypogean, terrestrial predators.
