= Draculoides piscivultus =

Scientific classification
- Kingdom: Animalia
- Phylum: Arthropoda
- Subphylum: Chelicerata
- Class: Arachnida
- Order: Schizomida
- Family: Hubbardiidae
- Genus: Draculoides
- Species: D. piscivultus

Binomial name
- Draculoides piscivultus Abrams & Harvey, 2020

Species of short-tailed whip-scorpion

Draculoides piscivultus is a species of schizomid arachnids (commonly known as sprickets or short-tailed whip-scorpions) in the Hubbardiidae family. It is endemic to Australia. It was described in 2020 by Australian arachnologists Kym Abrams and Mark Harvey.

== Distribution and habitat ==
The species occurs in the arid Pilbara region of North West Western Australia. The type locality is about 23.5 km east-south-east of the iron-ore mining town of Pannawonica and some 1,400 km north of Perth.
