= Draculoides bythius =

Scientific classification
- Kingdom: Animalia
- Phylum: Arthropoda
- Subphylum: Chelicerata
- Class: Arachnida
- Order: Schizomida
- Family: Hubbardiidae
- Genus: Draculoides
- Species: D. bythius

Binomial name
- Draculoides bythius (Harvey, Berry, Edward & Humphreys, 2008)

Synonyms
- Paradraculoides bythius Harvey, Berry, Edward & Humphreys, 2008

Species of short-tailed whip-scorpion

Draculoides bythius is a species of schizomid arachnids (commonly known as short-tailed whip-scorpions) in the Hubbardiidae family. It is endemic to Australia. It was described in 2008 by Australian arachnologists Mark Harvey, Oliver Berry, Karen Edward and Garth Humphreys. The specific epithet bythius, from Greek bythios (‘of the deep’), refers to the species’ subterranean habitat.

== Distribution and habitat ==
The species occurs in the Pilbara region of North West Western Australia where there is underground water. The type locality is a borehole at Mesa B, some 40 km west of the iron-ore mining town of Pannawonica and 1,400 km north of Perth.
