= Indohya napierensis =

Scientific classification
- Kingdom: Animalia
- Phylum: Arthropoda
- Subphylum: Chelicerata
- Class: Arachnida
- Order: Pseudoscorpiones
- Family: Hyidae
- Genus: Indohya
- Species: I. napierensis

Binomial name
- Indohya napierensis Harvey & Volschenk, 2007

Species of pseudoscorpion

Indohya napierensis is a species of pseudoscorpion in the Hyidae family. It is endemic to Australia. It was described in 2007 by arachnologists Mark Harvey and Erich Volschenk.

== Distribution and habitat ==
The species occurs in the Kimberley region of North West Australia. The type locality is Old Napier Downs Cave (KN-1) in the Napier Range, where the holotype female was collected from beneath a rock in a vadose tube.

== Behaviour ==
The pseudoscorpions are cave-dwelling, terrestrial predators.
