= Indohya gollum =

Scientific classification
- Kingdom: Animalia
- Phylum: Arthropoda
- Subphylum: Chelicerata
- Class: Arachnida
- Order: Pseudoscorpiones
- Family: Hyidae
- Genus: Indohya
- Species: I. gollum

Binomial name
- Indohya gollum Harvey & Volschenk, 2007

Species of pseudoscorpion

Indohya gollum is a species of pseudoscorpion in the Hyidae family. It is endemic to Australia. It was described in 2007 by arachnologists Mark Harvey and Erich Volschenk.

== Distribution and habitat ==
The species occurs in the Kimberley region of North West Australia. The type locality is Nefertiti's Palace (Cave KNI-41) in the Ningbing Range, north of Kununurra in the Ord Victoria Plain bioregion.

== Behaviour ==
The pseudoscorpions are cave-dwelling terrestrial predators.
