= Ideoblothrus papillon =

Scientific classification
- Kingdom: Animalia
- Phylum: Arthropoda
- Subphylum: Chelicerata
- Class: Arachnida
- Order: Pseudoscorpiones
- Family: Syarinidae
- Genus: Ideoblothrus
- Species: I. papillon

Binomial name
- Ideoblothrus papillon Harvey, 1991

Species of pseudoscorpion

Ideoblothrus papillon is a species of pseudoscorpion in the Syarinidae family. It is endemic to Australia. It was described in 1991 by Australian arachnologist Mark Harvey. The specific epithet papillon refers to the type locality.

== Description ==
The body length of the holotype male is 2.32 mm; that of the paratype female is 2.67 mm. The colour is light reddish-brown. Eyes are absent.

== Distribution and habitat ==
The species occurs in North West Australia. The type locality is Papillon Cave (C-15), in the Cape Range, where the holotype was found beneath a stone in the dark zone.

== Behaviour ==
The pseudoscorpions are cave-dwelling, terrestrial predators.
