= Ideoblothrus woodi =

Scientific classification
- Kingdom: Animalia
- Phylum: Arthropoda
- Subphylum: Chelicerata
- Class: Arachnida
- Order: Pseudoscorpiones
- Family: Syarinidae
- Genus: Ideoblothrus
- Species: I. woodi

Binomial name
- Ideoblothrus woodi Harvey, 1991

Species of pseudoscorpion

Ideoblothrus woodi is a species of pseudoscorpion in the Syarinidae family. It is endemic to Australia. It was described in 1991 by Australian arachnologist Mark Harvey. The specific epithet woodi honours Ray Wood.

== Description ==
The body length of the holotype male is 1.69 mm. The colour is light reddish-brown. Eyes are absent.

== Distribution and habitat ==
The species occurs in North West Australia. The type locality is Cave C-167, in the Cape Range, where the holotype was found beneath a stone in the dark zone.

== Behaviour ==
The pseudoscorpions are cave-dwelling, terrestrial predators.
