= Ideoblothrus westi =

Scientific classification
- Kingdom: Animalia
- Phylum: Arthropoda
- Subphylum: Chelicerata
- Class: Arachnida
- Order: Pseudoscorpiones
- Family: Syarinidae
- Genus: Ideoblothrus
- Species: I. westi

Binomial name
- Ideoblothrus westi Harvey & Edward, 2007

Species of pseudoscorpion

Ideoblothrus westi is a species of pseudoscorpion in the Syarinidae family. It is endemic to Australia. It was described in 1991 by Australian arachnologists Mark Harvey and Karen Edward. The specific epithet westi honours Paul West, collector of the holotype.

== Description ==
The body length of the female holotype is 1.883 mm. The colour of the pedipalps is reddish-brown, the legs pale yellow-brown, with the rest of the body pale yellow. Eyes are absent.

== Distribution and habitat ==
The species occurs in the Pilbara region of North West Australia. The type locality is a borehole (B7) in alluvial sediments of the Fortescue River.

== Behaviour ==
The pseudoscorpions are hypogean, terrestrial predators.
