= Ideoblothrus nesotymbus =

Scientific classification
- Kingdom: Animalia
- Phylum: Arthropoda
- Subphylum: Chelicerata
- Class: Arachnida
- Order: Pseudoscorpiones
- Family: Syarinidae
- Genus: Ideoblothrus
- Species: I. nesotymbus

Binomial name
- Ideoblothrus nesotymbus Harvey & Edward, 2007

Species of pseudoscorpion

Ideoblothrus nesotymbus is a species of pseudoscorpion in the Syarinidae family. It is endemic to Australia. It was described in 1991 by Australian arachnologists Mark Harvey and Karen Edward. The specific epithet nesotymbus comes from Greek: nesos (‘island’) and tymbos (‘tomb’), with reference to the type locality.

== Description ==
The body length of the male holotype is 1.35 mm; that of paratype females is 1.79-2.31 mm. The colour of carapace and pedipalps is reddish-brown, with the chelicerae and coxae orange, legs and abdomen pale tan. Eyes are absent.

== Distribution and habitat ==
The species occurs on Barrow Island off the Pilbara coast of North West Australia. The type locality is a borehole in limestone karst, 5.8 km north-west of Chevron Texaco Camp.

== Behaviour ==
The pseudoscorpions are hypogean, terrestrial predators.
