= Anysrius brochus =

Scientific classification
- Kingdom: Animalia
- Phylum: Arthropoda
- Subphylum: Chelicerata
- Class: Arachnida
- Order: Pseudoscorpiones
- Family: Syarinidae
- Genus: Anysrius
- Species: A. brochus

Binomial name
- Anysrius brochus Harvey, 1998

Species of pseudoscorpion

Anysrius brochus is a species of pseudoscorpion in the Hyidae family. It is endemic to Australia. It was described in 1998 by Australian arachnologist Mark Harvey. The specific epithet brochus (Latin: ‘projection of teeth’) refers to the cheliceral teeth of the male.

== Description ==
The body length of the holotype male is 1.52 mm; that of the paratype female is 1.63 mm. The carapace and pedipalps are reddish-brown; the rest of the body paler.

== Distribution and habitat ==
The species occurs in North West Tasmania. The type locality is a site on Chatlee Road in the Salmon River forestry area, where the holotype was found in Eucalyptus obliqua wet sclerophyll forest.

== Behaviour ==
The pseudoscorpions are terrestrial predators that inhabit plant litter.
