= Indohya haroldi =

Scientific classification
- Kingdom: Animalia
- Phylum: Arthropoda
- Subphylum: Chelicerata
- Class: Arachnida
- Order: Pseudoscorpiones
- Family: Hyidae
- Genus: Indohya
- Species: I. haroldi

Binomial name
- Indohya haroldi Harvey & Volschenk, 2007

Species of pseudoscorpion

Indohya haroldi is a species of pseudoscorpion in the Hyidae family. It is endemic to Australia. It was described in 2007 by arachnologists Mark Harvey and Erich Volschenk.

== Distribution and habitat ==
The species occurs in the Kimberley region of North West Australia. The type locality is Theda Pass, near Kalumburu, where specimens were collected from beneath rocks.

== Behaviour ==
The pseudoscorpions are terrestrial predators.
