= Ideoblothrus godfreyi =

Scientific classification
- Kingdom: Animalia
- Phylum: Arthropoda
- Subphylum: Chelicerata
- Class: Arachnida
- Order: Pseudoscorpiones
- Family: Syarinidae
- Genus: Ideoblothrus
- Species: I. godfreyi

Binomial name
- Ideoblothrus godfreyi (Ellingsen, 1912)

Species of arachnid

Ideoblothrus godfreyi is a species of pseudoscorpion. It is known exclusively from the type locality of Frankfort Hill, King Williams Town Div., Cape Province, South Africa.
