= Anysrius =

Scientific classification
- Kingdom: Animalia
- Phylum: Arthropoda
- Subphylum: Chelicerata
- Class: Arachnida
- Order: Pseudoscorpiones
- Family: Syarinidae
- Genus: Anysrius; Harvey, 1998

Type species
- Anysrius chamberlini Harvey, 1998

Genus of pseudoscorpions

Anysrius is a genus of pseudoscorpions in the Syarinidae family. It is endemic to the Australian state of Tasmania. It was described in 1998 by Australian arachnologist Mark Harvey. The genus name Anysrius is an anagram of its sister genus Syarinus.

== Species ==
As of October 2023, the World Pseudoscorpiones Catalog accepted the following two species:

- Anysrius brochus Harvey, 1998
- Anysrius chamberlini Harvey, 1998
