= Draculoides julianneae =

Scientific classification
- Kingdom: Animalia
- Phylum: Arthropoda
- Subphylum: Chelicerata
- Class: Arachnida
- Order: Schizomida
- Family: Hubbardiidae
- Genus: Draculoides
- Species: D. julianneae

Binomial name
- Draculoides julianneae Harvey, 2001

Species of short-tailed whip-scorpion

Draculoides julianneae, also known as the Western Cape Range Draculoides, is a species of schizomid arachnids (commonly known as short-tailed whip-scorpions) in the Hubbardiidae family. It is endemic to Australia. It was described in 2001 by Australian arachnologist Mark Harvey. The specific epithet julianneae honours Julianne Waldock for her efforts in collecting schizomids.

== Distribution and habitat ==
The species occurs in North West Western Australia. The type locality is Cave C-215 on the Cape Range Peninsula.

== Behaviour ==
The arachnids are cave-dwelling, terrestrial predators.
