= Draculoides vinei =

Scientific classification
- Kingdom: Animalia
- Phylum: Arthropoda
- Subphylum: Chelicerata
- Class: Arachnida
- Order: Schizomida
- Family: Hubbardiidae
- Genus: Draculoides
- Species: D. julianneae

Binomial name
- Draculoides julianneae (Harvey, 1988)

Synonyms
- Schizomus vinei Harvey, 1988

Species of short-tailed whip-scorpion

Draculoides vinei is a species of schizomid arachnids (commonly known as short-tailed whip-scorpions) in the Hubbardiidae family. It is endemic to Australia. It was described in 1988 by Australian arachnologist Mark Harvey. The specific epithet vinei honours Brian Vine, a student of the species’ biology.

== Distribution and habitat ==
The species occurs in North West Western Australia. The type locality is Shot Pot Cave, C-106, on the Cape Range Peninsula.

== Behaviour ==
The arachnids are cave-dwelling, terrestrial predators.
