= Yinaraneus =

Scientific classification
- Kingdom: Animalia
- Phylum: Arthropoda
- Subphylum: Chelicerata
- Class: Arachnida
- Order: Araneae
- Infraorder: Araneomorphae
- Family: Araneidae
- Genus: Yinaraneus; Mi, Wang & Li, 2024

Type species
- Y. anhao Mi, Wang & Li, 2024

Species
- 2, see text

Genus of spiders

Yinaraneus is a genus of spiders in the family Araneidae.

== Distribution ==
Yinaraneus is known from Xishuangbanna in Yunnan province, China.

== Etymology ==
The genus is named after Chinese arachnologist Chang-Min Yin (Chinese: 尹长民; pinyin: Yǐnzhǎngmín) (1923-2009), in combination with the related genus Araneus.

The two species are named after songs by Taiwanese singer Jay Chou, 暗號; Ànhào ("secret code") and 彩虹; Cǎihóng ("rainbow").

== Taxonomy ==
The genus resembles Xylethrus.

== Species ==
As of October 2025, this genus includes two species:

- Yinaraneus anhao Mi, Wang & Li, 2024 – China (type species)
- Yinaraneus caihong Mi, Wang & Li, 2024 – China
