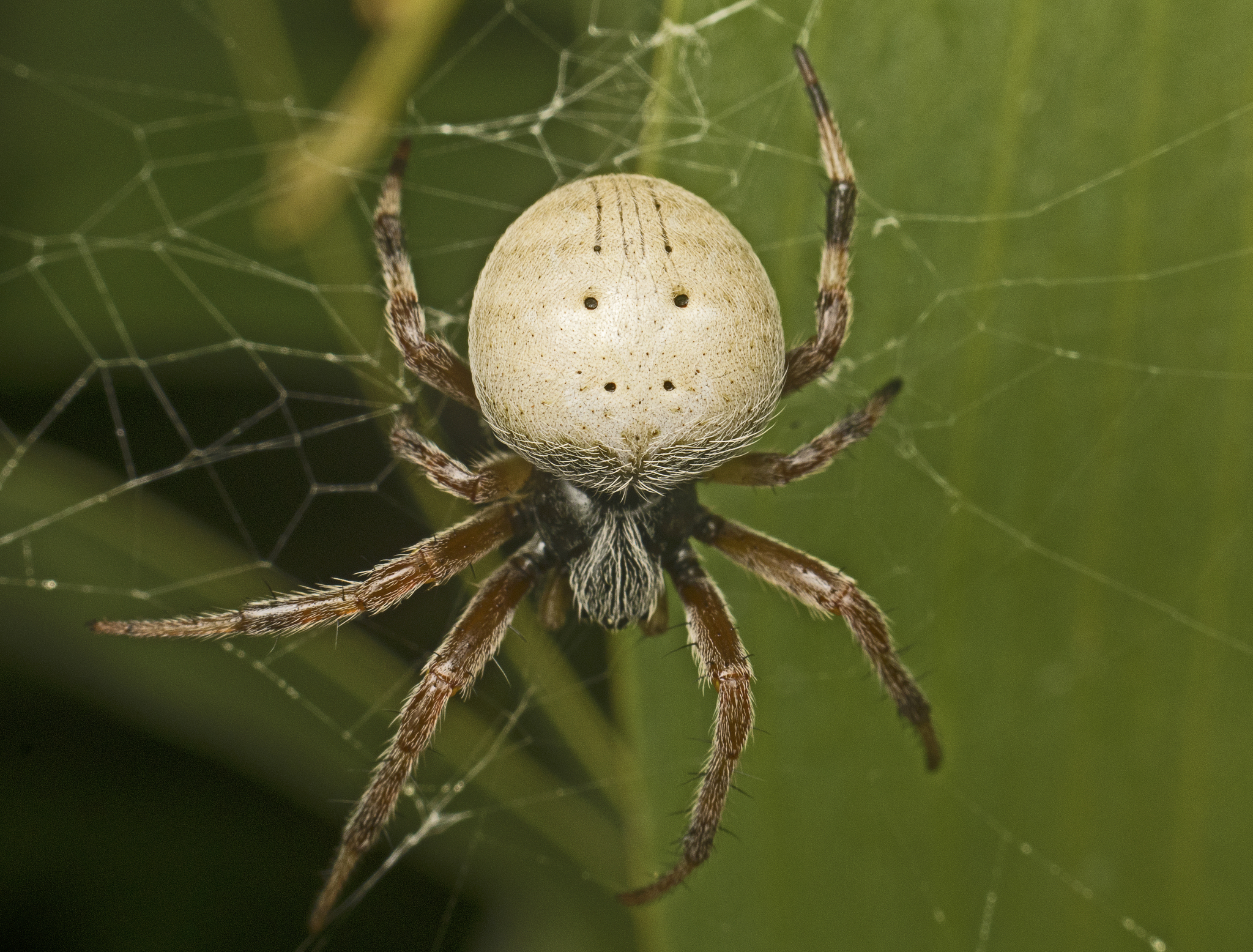
- female M. albida
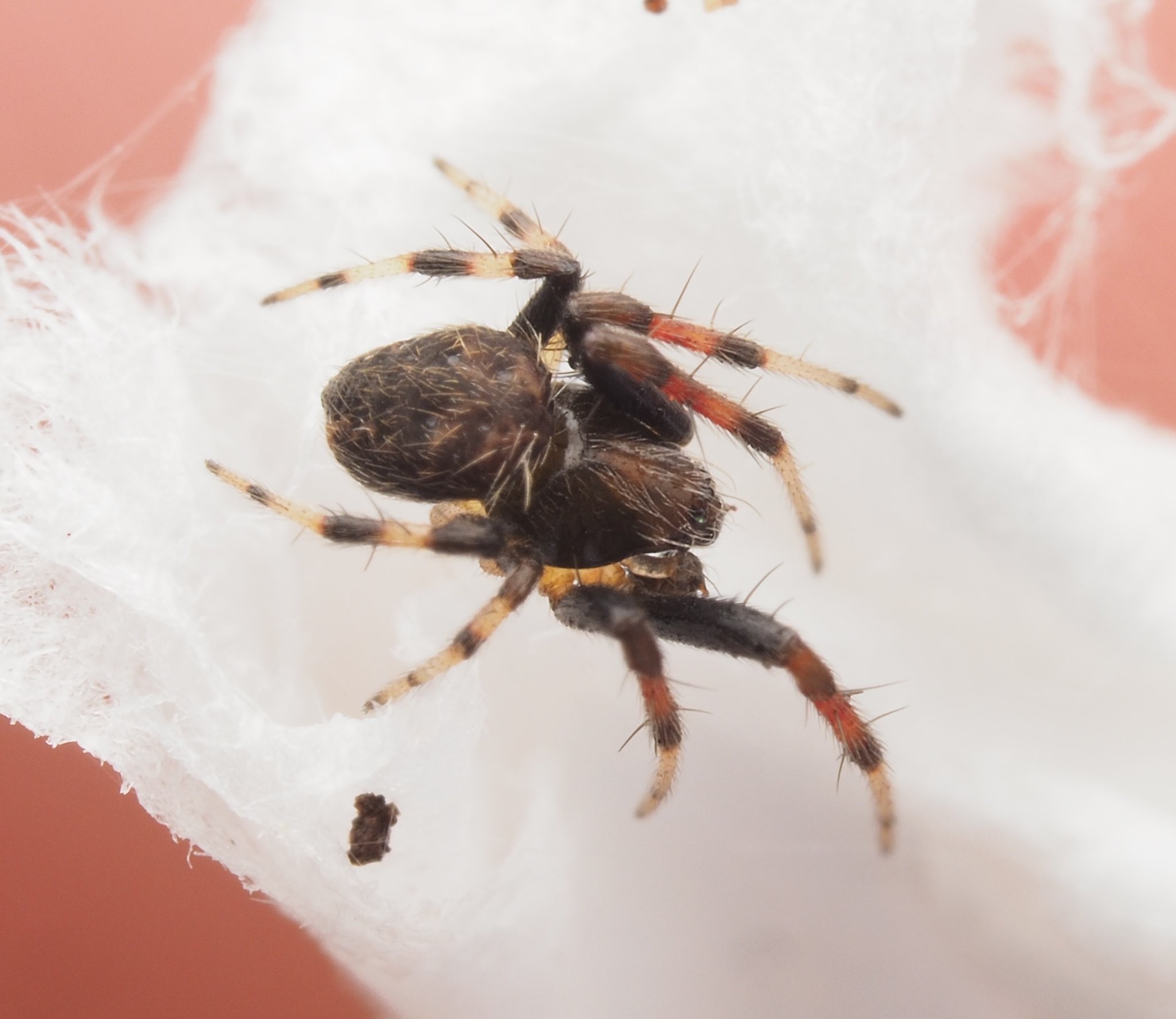
- male M. albida

Scientific classification
- Kingdom: Animalia
- Phylum: Arthropoda
- Subphylum: Chelicerata
- Class: Arachnida
- Order: Araneae
- Infraorder: Araneomorphae
- Family: Araneidae
- Genus: Mangrovia; Framenau & Castanheira, 2022

Type species
- Epeira albida L. Koch, 1871

Species
- 2, see text

= Mangrovia =

Genus of spiders

Mangrovia is a genus of spiders in the family Araneidae.

== Distribution ==
Mangrovia occurs in Australia, with M. albida recorded from Queensland and Western Australia, and also present in New Caledonia.

== Description ==
Spiders in this genus exhibit extreme sexual size dimorphism. Females reach a length of 8-10 mm, with males in the range of 2.5-3 mm.

== Etymology ==
The genus is named after coastal mangroves, one of the preferred habitats for both species.

== Species ==
As of October 2025, this genus includes two species:

- Mangrovia albida (L. Koch, 1871) – Australia (Queensland), New Caledonia (type species)
- Mangrovia occidentalis Framenau & Castanheira, 2022 – Australia (Western Australia)
