= Chitrella regina =

Conservation status
- Critically Imperiled (NatureServe)

Scientific classification
- Kingdom: Animalia
- Phylum: Arthropoda
- Subphylum: Chelicerata
- Class: Arachnida
- Order: Pseudoscorpiones
- Family: Syarinidae
- Genus: Chitrella
- Species: C. regina

Binomial name
- Chitrella regina Malcolm & Chamberlin, 1960

Species of pseudoscorpion

Chitrella regina is a species of pseudoscorpions in the family Syarinidae.

== Distribution ==
The species is endemic to West Virginia in the United States. It is found in Greenbrier County in Coffman's Cave.

== Description ==
The female holotype measures 2.6 millimetres (0.10 in)

== Original publications ==
- Malcolm & Chamberlin, 1960 : The pseudoscorpion genus Chitrella (Chelonethida, Syarinidae). American Museum Novitates, No. 1989, p. 1-19 ().
