= Ideoblothrus milikapiti =

Scientific classification
- Kingdom: Animalia
- Phylum: Arthropoda
- Subphylum: Chelicerata
- Class: Arachnida
- Order: Pseudoscorpiones
- Family: Syarinidae
- Genus: Ideoblothrus
- Species: I. milikapiti

Binomial name
- Ideoblothrus milikapiti Harvey & Edward, 2007

Species of pseudoscorpion

Ideoblothrus milikapiti is a species of pseudoscorpion in the Syarinidae family. It is endemic to Australia. It was described in 1991 by Australian arachnologists Mark Harvey and Karen Edward. The specific epithet milikapiti refers to the type locality.

== Description ==
The body lengths of two male specimens (holotype and paratype) are 1.04 and 1.26 mm. The colour of the pedipalps and chelicerae is reddish-orange, the carapace slightly orange, and the rest of the body pale yellow. Eyes are absent.

== Distribution and habitat ==
The species occurs in the Tiwi Islands of the Northern Territory. The type locality is a rainforest thicket at Milikapiti on Melville Island.

== Behaviour ==
The pseudoscorpions are terrestrial predators.
