= Ideoblothrus vampirorum =

Scientific classification
- Kingdom: Animalia
- Phylum: Arthropoda
- Subphylum: Chelicerata
- Class: Arachnida
- Order: Pseudoscorpiones
- Family: Syarinidae
- Genus: Ideoblothrus
- Species: I. vampirorum

Binomial name
- Ideoblothrus vampirorum Muchmore, 1982

Species of arachnid

Ideoblothrus vampirorum is a species of pseudoscorpion. It is found within a cave known as the Cueva de los Vampiros in the Mexican state of Tamaulipas, from which it derives its name.
