= Ideoblothrus mexicanus =

Scientific classification
- Kingdom: Animalia
- Phylum: Arthropoda
- Subphylum: Chelicerata
- Class: Arachnida
- Order: Pseudoscorpiones
- Family: Syarinidae
- Genus: Ideoblothrus
- Species: I. mexicanus

Binomial name
- Ideoblothrus mexicanus (Muchmore, 1972)

Species of pseudoscorpion

Ideoblothrus mexicanus is a species of pseudoscorpion. It is endemic to the Mexican state of Tamaulipas.
