= Draculoides =

Scientific classification
- Kingdom: Animalia
- Phylum: Arthropoda
- Subphylum: Chelicerata
- Class: Arachnida
- Order: Schizomida
- Family: Hubbardiidae
- Subfamily: Hubbardiinae
- Genus: Draculoides; Harvey, 1992

Type species
- Draculoides vinei Harvey, 1988

Synonyms
- Paradraculoides Harvey, Berry, Edward & Humphreys, 2008

Genus of short-tailed whip-scorpions

Draculoides is a genus of troglobite schizomid arachnids endemic to North West Australia. Often mistaken for spiders, they are commonly known as short-tailed whip-scorpions or sprickets.

== Description ==
Schizomids are small, soil-dwelling, eight-legged invertebrates that walk on six legs and use the two modified front legs as feelers. They employ large fang-like pedipalps, or pincers, to grasp invertebrate prey and crunch it into pieces before sucking out the juices.

== Taxonomy ==
The genus was first described in 1992 by Mark Harvey of the Western Australian Museum, based on his earlier description of Schizomus vinei (Draculoides vinei).

A second species was described in 1995, Draculoides bramstokeri, based on specimens found at Barrow Island; the specific epithet honours Bram Stoker, the author of Dracula. The allusion to this fictional character, a vampire, in the name of the genus is given for the method of consuming its prey, and further allusions to vampirism appear in the epithets of subsequently described species.

The genus is considered a senior synonym of Paradraculoides, due to paraphyly and a lack of consistent morphological differences.

== Species ==
As of September 2023, the World Arachnida Catalog accepted the following species:

- Draculoides affinis (Framenau, Hamilton, Finston, Humphreys, Abrams, Huey & Harvey, 2018)
- Draculoides akashae Abrams & Harvey, 2020
- Draculoides anachoretus (Harvey, Berry, Edward & Humphreys, 2008)
- Draculoides belalugosii Abrams & Harvey, 2020
- Draculoides bramstokeri Harvey & Humphreys, 1995
- Draculoides brooksi Harvey, 2001
- Draculoides bythius (Harvey, Berry, Edward & Humphreys, 2008)
- Draculoides carmillae Abrams & Harvey, 2020
- Draculoides catho (Framenau, Hamilton, Finston, Humphreys, Abrams, Huey & Harvey, 2018)
- Draculoides celatus (Framenau, Hamilton, Finston, Humphreys, Abrams, Huey & Harvey, 2018)
- Draculoides christopherleei Abrams & Harvey, 2020
- Draculoides claudiae Abrams & Harvey, 2020
- Draculoides cochranus (Framenau, Hamilton, Finston, Humphreys, Abrams, Huey & Harvey, 2018)
- Draculoides confusus (Framenau, Hamilton, Finston, Humphreys, Abrams, Huey & Harvey, 2018)
- Draculoides eremius (Abrams & Harvey, 2015)
- Draculoides gnophicola (Harvey, Berry, Edward & Humphreys, 2008)
- Draculoides immortalis Abrams & Harvey, 2020
- Draculoides julianneae Harvey, 2001
- Draculoides karenbassettae Abrams & Harvey, 2020
- Draculoides kryptus (Harvey, Berry, Edward & Humphreys, 2008)
- Draculoides mckechnieorum Abrams & Harvey, 2020
- Draculoides mesozeirus Harvey, Berry, Edward & Humphreys, 2008
- Draculoides minae Abrams & Harvey, 2020
- Draculoides neoanthropus Harvey, Berry, Edward & Humphreys, 2008
- Draculoides noctigrassator Abrams & Harvey, 2020
- Draculoides nosferatu Abrams & Harvey, 2020
- Draculoides obrutus (Framenau, Hamilton, Finston, Humphreys, Abrams, Huey & Harvey, 2018)
- Draculoides piscivultus Abrams & Harvey, 2020
- Draculoides trinity (Framenau, Hamilton, Finston, Humphreys, Abrams, Huey & Harvey, 2018)
- Draculoides vinei (Harvey, 1988)
- Draculoides warramboo Abrams & Harvey, 2020

== See also ==
- Threatened fauna of Australia
