= Syarinus enhuycki =

Scientific classification
- Domain: Eukaryota
- Kingdom: Animalia
- Phylum: Arthropoda
- Subphylum: Chelicerata
- Class: Arachnida
- Order: Pseudoscorpiones
- Family: Syarinidae
- Genus: Syarinus
- Species: S. enhuycki

Binomial name
- Syarinus enhuycki Muchmore, 1968

Species of pseudoscorpion

Syarinus enhuycki is a species of pseudoscorpion in the family Syarinidae.
