= Ideoblothrus maya =

Scientific classification
- Kingdom: Animalia
- Phylum: Arthropoda
- Subphylum: Chelicerata
- Class: Arachnida
- Order: Pseudoscorpiones
- Family: Syarinidae
- Genus: Ideoblothrus
- Species: I. maya

Binomial name
- Ideoblothrus maya (J. C. Chamberlin, 1938)

Species of pseudoscorpion

Ideoblothrus maya is a species of pseudoscorpion. It is only found within the type locality of one unnamed cave off San Roque Road in Oxkutzcab, Yucatán, Mexico.
