= Ideoblothrus curazavius =

Scientific classification
- Kingdom: Animalia
- Phylum: Arthropoda
- Subphylum: Chelicerata
- Class: Arachnida
- Order: Pseudoscorpiones
- Family: Syarinidae
- Genus: Ideoblothrus
- Species: I. curazavius

Binomial name
- Ideoblothrus curazavius (Wagenaar-Hummelinck, 1948)

Species of pseudoscorpions

Ideoblothrus curazavius is a species of pseudoscorpion.
