= Draculoides brooksi =

Scientific classification
- Kingdom: Animalia
- Phylum: Arthropoda
- Subphylum: Chelicerata
- Class: Arachnida
- Order: Schizomida
- Family: Hubbardiidae
- Genus: Draculoides
- Species: D. brooksi

Binomial name
- Draculoides brooksi Harvey, 2001

Species of short-tailed whip-scorpion

Draculoides brooksi is a species of schizomid arachnid (commonly known as a short-tailed whip-scorpion) in the Hubbardiidae family. It is endemic to Australia. It was described in 2001 by Australian arachnologist Mark Harvey. The specific epithet brooksi honours Darren Brooks for his skills in collecting schizomids and other cave creatures.

== Distribution and habitat ==
The species occurs in North West Western Australia. The type locality is Ampolex 'A' borehole on the north-eastern part of the Cape Range Peninsula.

== Behaviour ==
The arachnids are cave-dwelling, terrestrial predators.
