= Draculoides neoanthropus =

Scientific classification
- Kingdom: Animalia
- Phylum: Arthropoda
- Subphylum: Chelicerata
- Class: Arachnida
- Order: Schizomida
- Family: Hubbardiidae
- Genus: Draculoides
- Species: D. neoanthropus

Binomial name
- Draculoides neoanthropus Harvey, Berry, Edward & Humphreys, 2008

Species of short-tailed whip-scorpion

Draculoides neoanthropus is a species of schizomid arachnids (commonly known as short-tailed whip-scorpions) in the Hubbardiidae family. It is endemic to Australia. It was described in 2008 by Australian arachnologists Mark Harvey, Oliver Berry, Karen Edward and Garth Humphreys. The specific epithet mesozeirus, from Greek neo (‘new’) and anthropos (‘man’), refers to the type locality.

== Distribution and habitat ==
The species occurs in the south-eastern Pilbara region of North West Western Australia where there is underground water. The type locality is a borehole at Ore Body 25, 6.5 km east-north-east of the iron-ore mining town of Newman and some 1,200 km north of Perth.
