= Ideoblothrus seychellesensis =

Conservation status
- Endangered (IUCN 3.1)

Scientific classification
- Kingdom: Animalia
- Phylum: Arthropoda
- Subphylum: Chelicerata
- Class: Arachnida
- Order: Pseudoscorpiones
- Family: Syarinidae
- Genus: Ideoblothrus
- Species: I. seychellesensis

Binomial name
- Ideoblothrus seychellesensis Chamberlin, 1930

Species of arachnid

Ideoblothrus seychellesensis is a species of pseudoscorpion. It is found in the Seychelles on Felicite Island and Silhouette Island. As of 2012, the species has been considered endangered and is listed on the IUCN red list.

== Range and habitat ==
Ideoblothrus seychellesensis has been documented on two islands - Felicite Island and Silhouette Island, both in the Seychelles. Its recordings are on coastal habitats, and is likely found under bark in lowland woodland. However, it is unknown if it truly resides under bark, as the others of the Ideoblothrus genus are typically found among leaf litter in tropical forests. More evidence is needed.

== Ecology ==
The species currently faces the primary threat of habitat loss due to human development in the region, alongside invasive diseases. It previously faced the risk of agriculture harming its ecosystem, however this is no longer the case.

== Etymology ==
The species derives its name from the country it is found in.
