= Ideoblothrus grandis =

Scientific classification
- Kingdom: Animalia
- Phylum: Arthropoda
- Subphylum: Chelicerata
- Class: Arachnida
- Order: Pseudoscorpiones
- Family: Syarinidae
- Genus: Ideoblothrus
- Species: I. grandis

Binomial name
- Ideoblothrus grandis (Muchmore, 1972)

Species of arachnid

Ideoblothrus grandis is a species of pseudoscorpion. It is only found within Cueva del Tio Ticho, Chiapas, Mexico.
