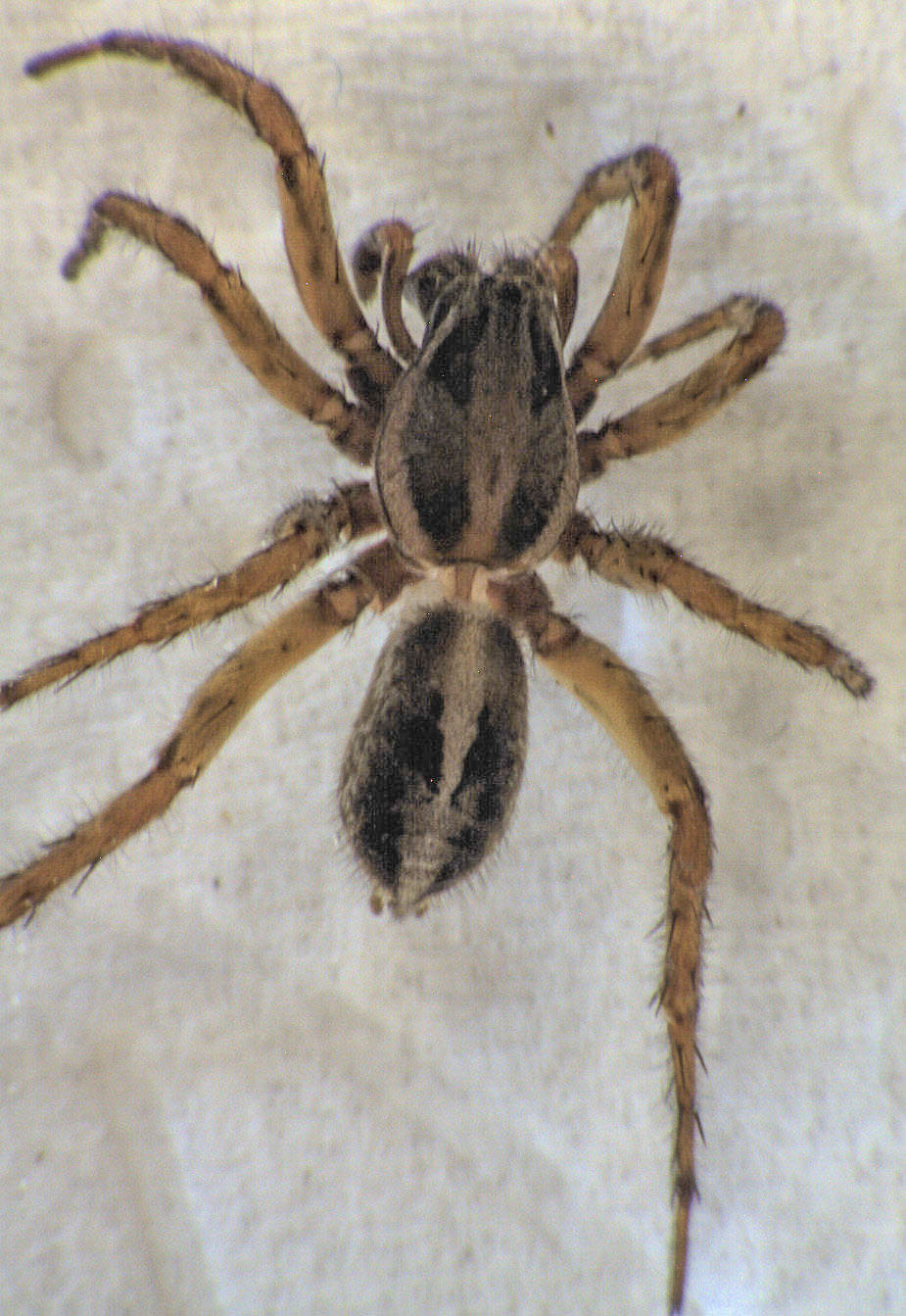
- Artoriopsis expolita

Scientific classification
- Kingdom: Animalia
- Phylum: Arthropoda
- Subphylum: Chelicerata
- Class: Arachnida
- Order: Araneae
- Infraorder: Araneomorphae
- Family: Lycosidae
- Subfamily: Artoriinae
- Genus: Artoriopsis; Framenau, 2007

Type species
- Lycosa expolita L. Koch, 1877

Species
- See text.

Diversity
- 12 species

= Artoriopsis =

Genus of spiders

Artoriopsis is a genus of wolf spiders first described by Volker W. Framenau in 2007. It is endemic to Australia and is most diverse in the southern half of the continent, though A. anacardium is found in the tropical north of Australia. Its body size ranges from 3 to 11 mm (1/8 to 7/16 in), with males smaller than females. It appears to prefer open, vegetated or sandy areas of moderate humidity.

== Species ==
As of May 2022 it contains twelve species:

- Artoriopsis anacardium Framenau, 2007 — Northern Territory, Queensland
- Artoriopsis bogabilla Framenau & Douglas, 2021 — New South Wales
- Artoriopsis eccentrica Framenau, 2007 — Western Australia, South Australia, Victoria
- Artoriopsis expolita (L. Koch, 1877) — Australia (incl. Tasmania), New Zealand
- Artoriopsis joergi Framenau, 2007 — Western Australia, South Australia
- Artoriopsis klausi Framenau, 2007 — South Australia, New South Wales, Victoria
- Artoriopsis lacustris Framenau & Douglas, 2021 — New South Wales
- Artoriopsis melissae Framenau, 2007 — Queensland to Tasmania
- Artoriopsis mulier Framenau & Douglas, 2021 — Capital Territory
- Artoriopsis murphyi Framenau & Douglas, 2021 — Tasmania
- Artoriopsis orientalis Framenau & Douglas, 2021 — New South Wales
- Artoriopsis whitehouseae Framenau, 2007 — Queensland, New South Wales
