= Ideoblothrus ceylonicus =

Scientific classification
- Kingdom: Animalia
- Phylum: Arthropoda
- Subphylum: Chelicerata
- Class: Arachnida
- Order: Pseudoscorpiones
- Family: Syarinidae
- Genus: Ideoblothrus
- Species: I. ceylonicus

Binomial name
- Ideoblothrus ceylonicus (Beier, 1973)

Species of pseudoscorpions

Ideoblothrus ceylonicus is a species of pseudoscorpion.
