= Indohya =

Scientific classification
- Kingdom: Animalia
- Phylum: Arthropoda
- Subphylum: Chelicerata
- Class: Arachnida
- Order: Pseudoscorpiones
- Family: Hyidae
- Genus: Indohya; Beier, 1974

Type species
- Indohya besucheti Beier, 1974

Synonyms
- Hyella Harvey, 1993

Genus of pseudoscorpions

Indohya is a genus of pseudoscorpions in the Hyidae family. It was described in 1974 by Austrian arachnologist Max Beier.

== Species ==
As of October 2023, the World Pseudoscorpiones Catalog accepted the following 39 species:

- Indohya adlardi Harvey & Burger, 2023
- Indohya alexanderi Harvey & Burger, 2023
- Indohya anastomosa Harvey & Burger, 2023
- Indohya aphana Harvey & Burger, 2023
- Indohya aquila Harvey & Burger, 2023
- Indohya arcana Harvey & Burger, 2023
- Indohya arnoldstrongi Harvey & Burger, 2023
- Indohya beieri Harvey, 1993
- Indohya besucheti Beier, 1974
- Indohya boltoni Harvey & Burger, 2023
- Indohya caecata Beier, 1974
- Indohya cardo Harvey & Burger, 2023
- Indohya catherineae Harvey & Burger, 2023
- Indohya cockingi Harvey & Burger, 2023
- Indohya cribbi Harvey & Burger, 2023
- Indohya currani Harvey, 2023
- Indohya damocles Harvey & Volschenk, 2007
- Indohya draconis Harvey & Burger, 2023
- Indohya finitima Harvey & Burger, 2023
- Indohya furtiva Harvey & Burger, 2023
- Indohya gollum Harvey & Volschenk, 2007
- Indohya haroldi Harvey & Volschenk, 2007
- Indohya humphreysi (Harvey, 1993)
- Indohya incomperta Harvey & Burger, 2023
- Indohya jacquelinae Harvey & Volschenk, 2007
- Indohya jessicae Harvey & Burger, 2023
- Indohya julianneae Harvey & Burger, 2023
- Indohya karenae Harvey & Burger, 2023
- Indohya lynbeazleyae Harvey & Burger, 2023
- Indohya morganstrongi Harvey & Burger, 2023
- Indohya napierensis Harvey & Volschenk, 2007
- Indohya panops Harvey, 1993
- Indohya pusilla Harvey, 1993
- Indohya rixi Harvey & Burger, 2023
- Indohya sachsei Harvey & Burger, 2023
- Indohya sagmata Harvey & Burger, 2023
- Indohya scanloni Harvey & Burger, 2023
- Indohya silenda Harvey & Burger, 2023
- Indohya typhlops Harvey, 1993
