= Quokkaraneus =

Scientific classification
- Kingdom: Animalia
- Phylum: Arthropoda
- Subphylum: Chelicerata
- Class: Arachnida
- Order: Araneae
- Infraorder: Araneomorphae
- Family: Araneidae
- Genus: Quokkaraneus; Castanheira & Framenau, 2022
- Species: Q. necopinus

Binomial name
- Quokkaraneus necopinus (Keyserling, 1887)

Synonyms
- Epeira necopina Keyserling, 1887; Araneus necopinus Rainbow, 1911

Species of spider

Quokkaraneus is a monotypic genus of spiders in the family Araneidae containing the single species, Quokkaraneus necopinus.

== Distribution ==
Quokkaraneus necopinus has been recorded from Australia (Western Australia, South Australia, Victoria).

== Etymology ==
The genus name is a combination of the Australian marsupial Quokka (Setonix brachyurus), indicating its Australian origin, and Araneus. Albany is the historical and current range of the Quokka.
