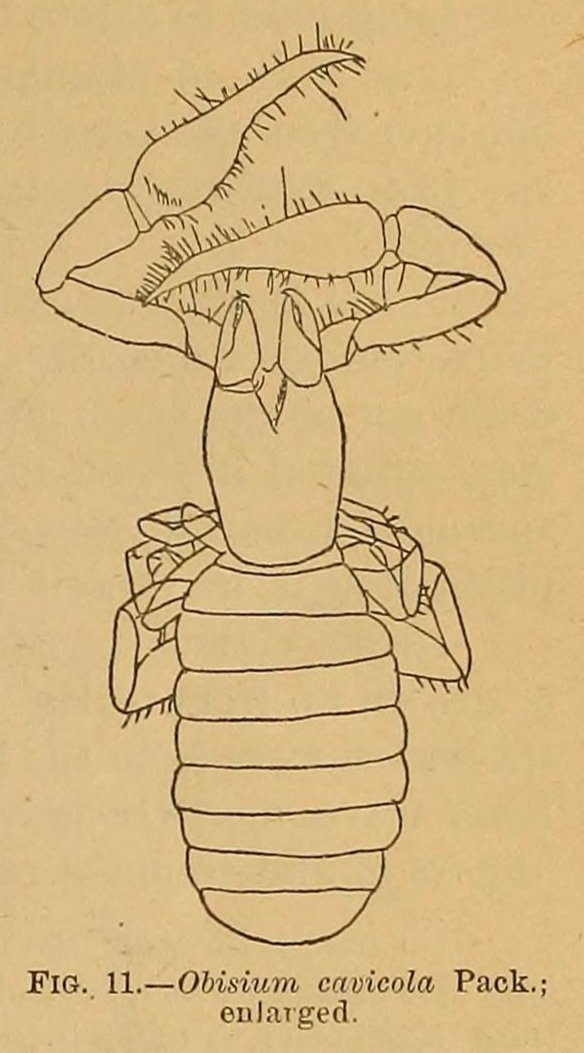
- Chitrella cavicola (the same as obisium cavicola)

Scientific classification
- Kingdom: Animalia
- Phylum: Arthropoda
- Subphylum: Chelicerata
- Class: Arachnida
- Order: Pseudoscorpiones
- Family: Syarinidae
- Genus: Chitrella; Beier, 1932

= Chitrella =

Genus of pseudoscorpions

Chitrella is a genus of pseudoscorpions in the family of Syarinidae.

== Distribution ==
The species in this genus are endemic to the United States.

== List of species ==
According to Pseudoscorpions of the World 1.2:

- Chitrella archeri Malcolm & Chamberlin, 1960
- Chitrella cala (Chamberlin, 1930)
- Chitrella cavicola (Packard, 1884)
- Chitrella elliotti Muchmore, 1992
- Chitrella major Muchmore, 1992
- Chitrella muesebecki Malcolm & Chamberlin, 1960
- Chitrella regina Malcolm & Chamberlin, 1960
- Chitrella superba Muchmore, 1973
- Chitrella transversa (Banks, 1909)
- Chitrella welbourni Muchmore, 1992

== Original publication ==
- (in German) Beier, 1932 : Pseudoscorpionidea I. Subord. Chthoniinea et Neobisiinea. Tierreich, vol. 57, p. 1-258.
- (in English) Chamberlin, 1930 : A synoptic classification of the false scorpions or chela-spinners, with a report on a cosmopolitan collection of the same. Part II. The Diplosphyronida (Arachnida-Chelonethida). Annals and Magazine of Natural History, ser. 10, n. 5, p. 1-48 & 585-620.
