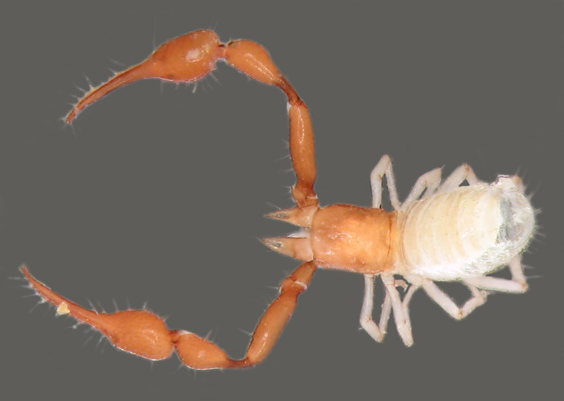
- Lusoblothrus aenigmaticus

Scientific classification
- Kingdom: Animalia
- Phylum: Arthropoda
- Subphylum: Chelicerata
- Class: Arachnida
- Order: Pseudoscorpiones
- Family: Syarinidae
- Genus: Lusoblothrus; Zaragoza & Reboleira, 2012

= Lusoblothrus =

Genus of pseudoscorpions

Lusoblothrus is a genus of pseudoscorpions in the family Syarinidae. The genus was created to accommodate its sole species, Lusoblothrus aenigmaticus. The species was recently discovered in Portugal, its description published in 2012.
