= Ideoblothrus =

Scientific classification
- Kingdom: Animalia
- Phylum: Arthropoda
- Subphylum: Chelicerata
- Class: Arachnida
- Order: Pseudoscorpiones
- Family: Syarinidae
- Genus: Ideoblothrus; Balzan, 1892

Type species
- Ideobisium (Ideoblothrus) similis Balzan, 1892

Synonyms
- Pachychitra Chamberlin, 1938

Genus of pseudoscorpions

Ideoblothrus is a genus of pseudoscorpions in the Syarinidae family. It was described in 1892 by Italian naturalist Luigi Balzan as a subgenus of Ideobisium.

== Species ==
As of October 2023, the World Pseudoscorpiones Catalog accepted the following species:

- Ideoblothrus amazonicus (Mahnert, 1979)
- Ideoblothrus baloghi (Mahnert, 1978)
- Ideoblothrus bipectinatus (Daday, 1897)
- Ideoblothrus brasiliensis (Mahnert, 1979)
- Ideoblothrus caecus (Mahnert, 1979)
- Ideoblothrus carinatus (Hoff, 1964)
- Ideoblothrus ceylonicus (Beier, 1973)
- Ideoblothrus colombiae Muchmore, 1982
- Ideoblothrus costaricensis (Beier, 1931)
- Ideoblothrus curazavius (Wagenaar-Hummelinck, 1948)
- Ideoblothrus descartes Harvey and Edward, 2007
- Ideoblothrus emigrans Mahnert, 2014
- Ideoblothrus fenestratus (Beier, 1955)
- Ideoblothrus floridensis (Muchmore, 1979)
- Ideoblothrus galapagensis Mahnert, 2014
- Ideoblothrus godfreyi (Ellingsen, 1912)
- Ideoblothrus grandis (Muchmore, 1972)
- Ideoblothrus holmi (Beier, 1955)
- Ideoblothrus insularum (Hoff, 1945)
- Ideoblothrus kochalkai Muchmore, 1982
- Ideoblothrus leleupi (Beier, 1959)
- Ideoblothrus lepesmei (Vachon, 1941)
- Ideoblothrus levipalpus Mahnert, 1985
- Ideoblothrus linnaei Harvey and Leng, 2008
- Ideoblothrus maya (Chamberlin, 1938)
- Ideoblothrus mexicanus (Muchmore, 1972)
- Ideoblothrus milikapiti Harvey and Edward, 2007
- Ideoblothrus muchmorei Heurtault, 1983
- Ideoblothrus nadineae Amieva Mau, Harvey and Harms, 2022
- Ideoblothrus nesotymbus Harvey and Edward, 2007
- Ideoblothrus occidentalis (Beier, 1959)
- Ideoblothrus palauensis (Beier, 1957)
- Ideoblothrus papillon Harvey, 1991
- Ideoblothrus paraensis Mahnert, 1985
- Ideoblothrus pisolitus Harvey and Edward, 2007
- Ideoblothrus pugil (Beier, 1964)
  - Ideoblothrus pugil pugil (Beier, 1964)
  - Ideoblothrus pugil robustus (Beier, 1966)
- Ideoblothrus pygmaeus (Hoff, 1964)
- Ideoblothrus safinai Amieva Mau, Harvey and Harms, 2022
- Ideoblothrus seychellesensis (Chamberlin, 1930)
- Ideoblothrus similis (Balzan, 1892)
- Ideoblothrus tenuis Mahnert, 1985
- Ideoblothrus truncatus (Hoff, 1964)
- Ideoblothrus vampirorum Muchmore, 1982
- Ideoblothrus westi Harvey and Edward, 2007
- Ideoblothrus woodi Harvey, 1991
- Ideoblothrus zicsii (Mahnert, 1978)
