= Yarraloola =

Pastoral lease in Western Australia

Coordinates: 21.568°S 115.878°E

Location in Western Australia

Yarraloola or Yarraloola Station is a pastoral lease that once operated as a sheep station but is currently operating as a cattle station in Western Australia.

It is located 47 kilometres (29 mi) west of Pannawonica and 80 kilometres (50 mi) east of Onslow along the Robe River in the Pilbara region.

Messrs. H. and W. Woolhouse took up Yarraloola in 1878 and had developed a good reputation for their breeding program for horses and sheep by 1886. Floodwaters following heavy rain caused severe damage to Yarraloola in 1894, with many parts of the homestead flooded under 1 foot (0.3 m) of water. A total of 400 sheep were washed away in the floodwaters as was about 10 miles (16 km) of fencing. By the end of the same year 10,500 sheep were shorn for a clip of 150 bales of wool.

The property was put up for auction in 1898; at this time it occupied an area of 295,400 acres (119,544 ha) and had 25 miles (40 km) of double frontage on the Robe River. The area was grassed with silver, plain and bundle-bundle grasses as well as areas of salt bush. Two three-room cottages made from jarrah with iron roofing, a corrugated iron woolshed, yards, sleeping quarters, kitchen and blacksmith shop had been built along with seven paddocks contained within 80 miles (129 km) of fencing. Stocked with 11,600 mixed sheep, 230 cattle and 180 horses watered by the river and seven windlasses, it was acquired by G.P Paterson and A.R. Richardson, who had previously partly owned Yeeda Station.

In 1915, the property passed 16,500 sheep over the boards during shearing producing 250 bales of wool. This followed an excellent season where the 17.5 inches (444 mm) of rain was recorded in six months. Although the 1919 season was poorer, with Yarraloola only receiving 1.59 inches (40 mm) over seven months, 19,500 sheep were shorn yielding 252 bales of wool.

The current homestead was constructed by Keith Paterson in 1919; the building process was quite slow but improved as road access to the station for motor vehicles arrived in the 1920s.

Station workers felt the tremor and saw the mushroom cloud produced by a nuclear test conducted on the Monte Bello Islands in 1952, situated approximately 80 miles (129 km) from the property.

The station was severely flooded in 2009 when the Robe River burst its banks. Jason Reimers, the station manager, his family, ringers, Matt Jordan and Cody Harper had to be evacuated from the property after a tropical depression crossed the coast.

Yarraloola is currently owned by Robe River Iron Associates joint venture through the Yarraloola Pastoral Company and managed by Rio Tinto.

== See also ==
- List of ranches and stations
