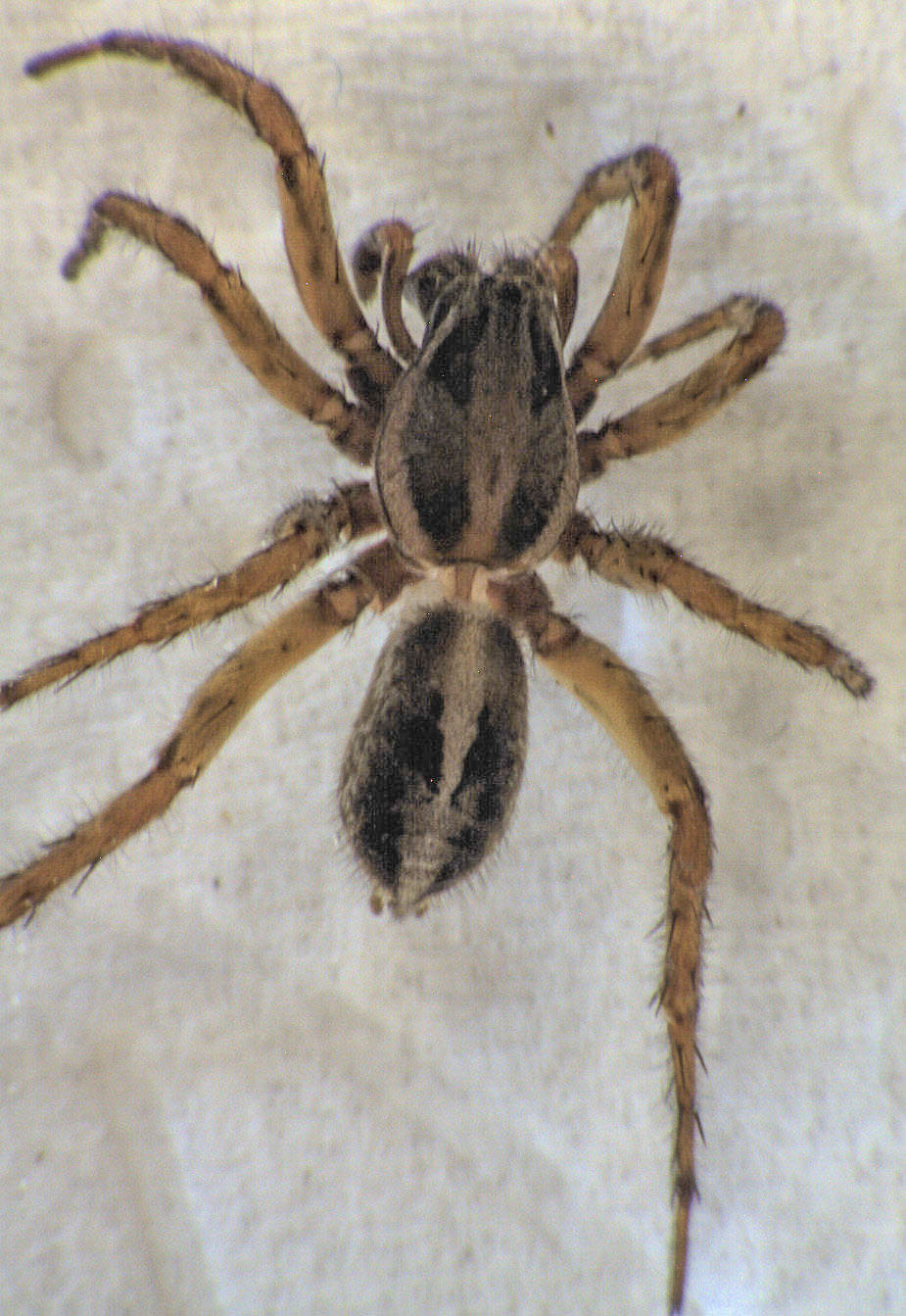

Scientific classification
- Kingdom: Animalia
- Phylum: Arthropoda
- Subphylum: Chelicerata
- Class: Arachnida
- Order: Araneae
- Infraorder: Araneomorphae
- Family: Lycosidae
- Genus: Artoriopsis
- Species: A. expolita

Binomial name
- Artoriopsis expolita (L. Koch, 1877)
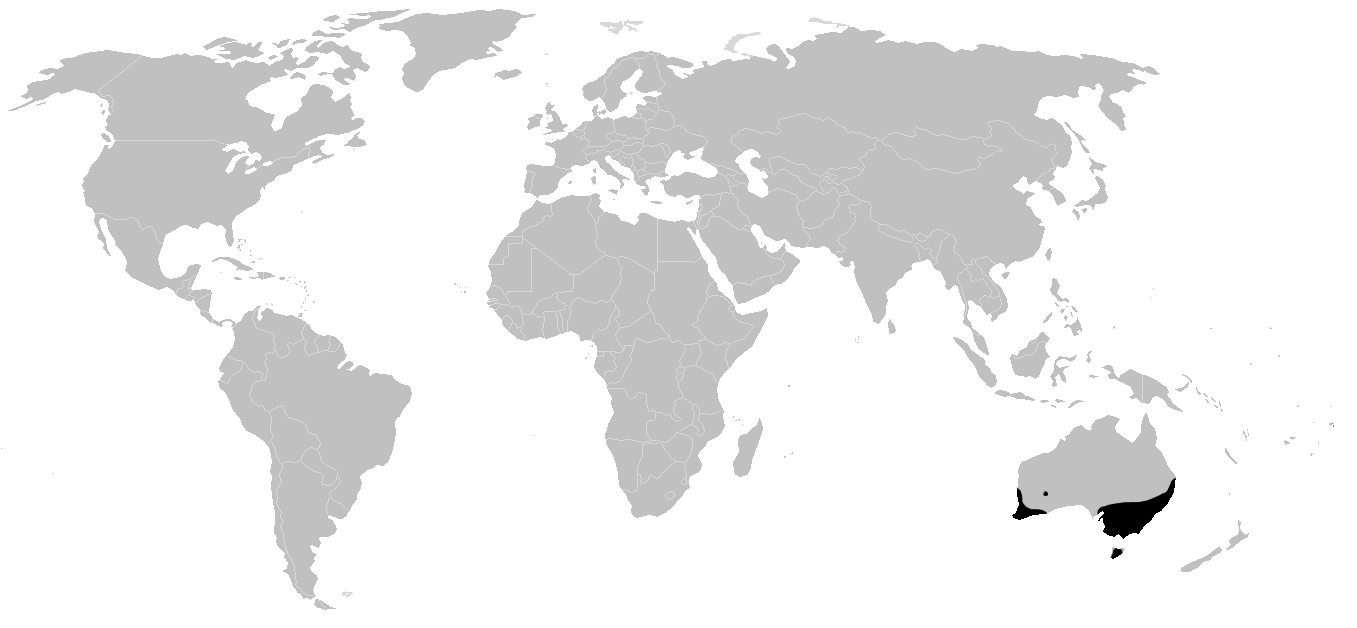

Synonyms
- Lycosa expolita Avicosa expolita Schizocosa expolita Trochosa expolita Trochosa expolita expolita Trochosa expolita impedita

= Artoriopsis expolita =

Species of spider

Artoriopsis expolita is a species of wolf spider from southern Australia, first described in 1877 by Ludwig Koch as Lycosa expolita.

Females are 9 mm (0.35 in) long, with males slightly smaller.

Artoriopsis expolita is a common spider in open, moderately moist environments and is often found near creeks and rivers, in foredunes, on pasture, and on suburban lawns. Most adults are found between October and January, with females found carrying egg sacs between November and December and found carrying spiderlings from December to January. Between March and August, the species is rarely found.

This species has been reported on several occasions as biting humans, resulting in occasional minor swelling and redness around the bite area.
