= Xylethrus =

Scientific classification
- Kingdom: Animalia
- Phylum: Arthropoda
- Subphylum: Chelicerata
- Class: Arachnida
- Order: Araneae
- Infraorder: Araneomorphae
- Family: Araneidae
- Genus: Xylethrus; Simon, 1895

Type species
- X. superbus Simon, 1895

Species
- 6, see text

Genus of spiders

Xylethrus is a genus of Central and South American orb-weaver spiders first described by Eugène Simon in 1895.

== Species ==
As of April 2019 it contains six species:

- Xylethrus ameda Levi, 1996 – Brazil
- Xylethrus anomid Levi, 1996 – Peru, Brazil
- Xylethrus arawak Archer, 1965 – Mexico, Jamaica
- Xylethrus perlatus Simon, 1895 – Brazil
- Xylethrus scrupeus Simon, 1895 – Panama to Bolivia, Brazil
- Xylethrus superbus Simon, 1895 (type) – Colombia, Peru, Bolivia, Paraguay, Brazil
