= Syarinus =

Scientific classification
- Kingdom: Animalia
- Phylum: Arthropoda
- Subphylum: Chelicerata
- Class: Arachnida
- Order: Pseudoscorpiones
- Family: Syarinidae
- Genus: Syarinus; J. C. Chamberlin, 1925

Genus of pseudoscorpions

Syarinus is a genus of pseudoscorpions in the family Syarinidae. There are about six described species in Syarinus.

== Species ==
These six species belong to the genus Syarinus:

- Syarinus enhuycki Muchmore, 1968
- Syarinus granulatus Chamberlin, 1930
- Syarinus honestus Hoff, 1956
- Syarinus obscurus (Banks, 1893)
- Syarinus palmeni Kaisila, 1964
- Syarinus strandi (Ellingsen, 1901)
