= Hya =

Hya or HYA may refer to:

- Hya language
- 3-Hydroxyaspartic acid
- Barnstable Municipal Airport, in Massachusetts, United States
- Hungarian Yachting Association
- Hyampolis, a city in Phocis, Ancient Greece
- Hydra (constellation)
- Ia of Cornwall, 5th- or 6th-century Christian martyr
