= Robe River (Australia) =

Coordinates: 21°18′53″S 115°40′29″E

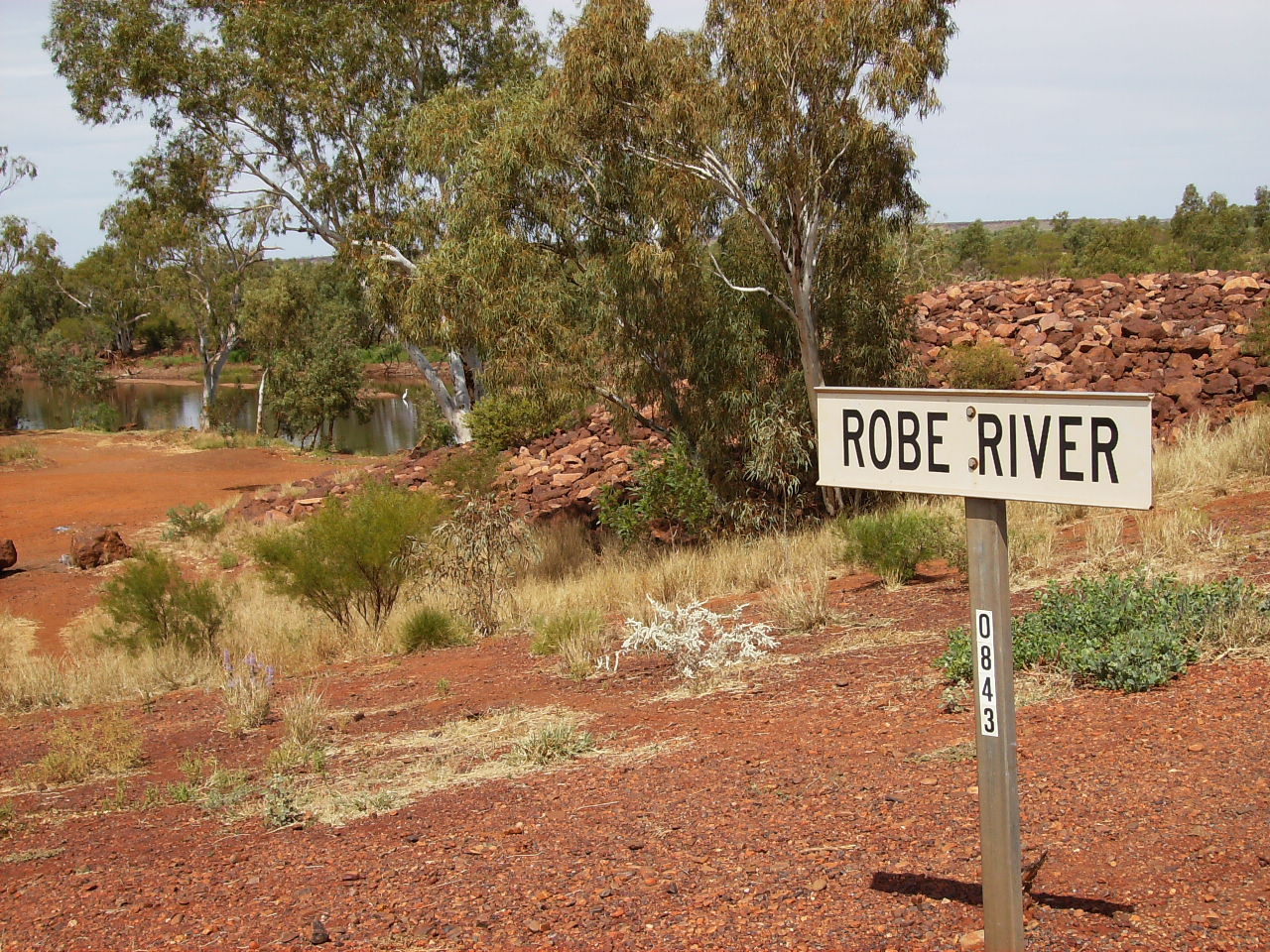

Location
- Country: Australia

Physical characteristics
- Source
  - location: Hamersley Range
  - elevation: 477 metres (1,565 ft)
- Mouth
  - location: Indian Ocean
  - elevation: sea level
- Length: 276 kilometres (171 mi)
- Basin size: 3,350 square kilometres (1,293 sq mi)

The Robe River is a river in the Pilbara region of Western Australia.

The headwaters of the river rise in the Hamersley Range near Marana Spring then flow in a north westerly direction past the Robe River-Deepdale mine, crossing the North West Coastal Highway near the Pannawonica turnoff then discharging into the Indian Ocean near Robe Point.

Robe River has two tributaries: Mungarathoona Creek and Kumina Creek.

The Robe is an ephemeral river and is restricted to a series of permanent pools that act as important refugia for native fauna through the dry season.

The rivers experiences periodical flooding. Following Cyclone Monty in 2004 the river was in full flood resulting in Pannawonica being cut off and people being rescued from the roof of Yarraloola homestead.

In 2009, following heavy rainfall, the river burst its banks cutting roads and railway lines. Yarraloola Station was evacuated and Rio Tinto railway network was disrupted as a result.
