= Hyidae =

Scientific classification
- Kingdom: Animalia
- Phylum: Arthropoda
- Subphylum: Chelicerata
- Class: Arachnida
- Order: Pseudoscorpiones
- Superfamily: Neobisioidea
- Family: Hyidae; Chamberlin, 1930

Genera
- Hya Chamberlin, 1930; Indohya Beier, 1974

Family of pseudoscorpions

Hyidae is a family of pseudoscorpions within the superfamily Neobisioidea. They can be found in South and Southeast Asia, Madagascar, and Australia. Their habitats mainly include plant litter and caves.

== Taxonomy ==
The family was described in 1930 by American arachnologist Joseph Conrad Chamberlin.

=== Genera ===
As of October 2023, the World Pseudoscorpiones Catalog accepted two genera however a genus, xxx, was described in 1993 that was placed in this family. Currently, Hyidae is split into two subfamilies; Hyinae and Indohyinae.

==== Hyinae ====
- Hya Chamberlin, 1930

==== Indohyinae ====
- Hyella M.S Harvey, 1993
- Indohya Beier, 1974
