= Volker W. Framenau =

German-born Australian arachnologist

- Born: Cologne
- Education: Philipps-University Marburg, University of Melbourne
- Known for: Taxonomy of spiders, especially wolf spiders
- Scientific career
- Fields: Arachnology, Entomology
- Workplaces: Murdoch University
- Author abbrev. (zoology): Framenau

Volker W. Framenau (born 1965, Cologne) is a German-born Australian arachnologist and entomologist.

He earned his M.Sc. in 1995 from Philipps-University Marburg (Populationsökologie und Ausbreitungsdynamik von Arctosa cinerea (Araneae, Lycosidae) in einer alpinen Wildflußlandschaft), and a Ph.D from Melbourne University in 2002 with the thesis Taxonomy, life history characteristics, and ecology of riparian wolf spiders (Araneae, Lycosidae) in the Victorian Alps, south-east Australia.

His zoological author abbreviation is Framenau. He has authored over 70 taxa, initially specialising in wolf spiders, but later in many other spider families including: tube web spiders (Segestriidae), leaf curling orb-weaving spiders, and orb-weaving spiders (Araneidae).

He is currently a senior lecturer at Murdoch University in the centre for Biosecurity and One Health, Harry Butler Institute, Murdoch University, where his specialities are listed as: Animal systematics and taxonomy, Biosecurity, Arachnida, Myriapoda and Macrophotography.

== See also ==
- Category:Taxa named by Volker W. Framenau
