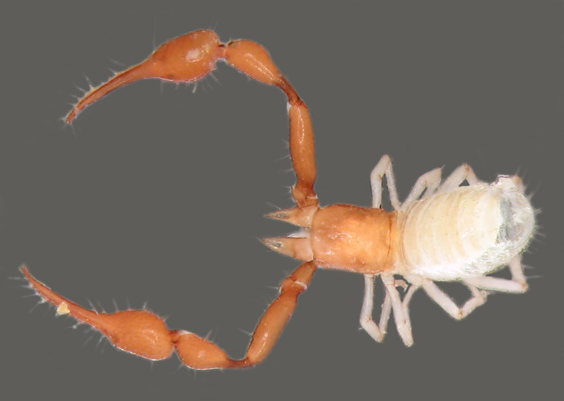
- Lusoblothrus aenigmaticus

Scientific classification
- Kingdom: Animalia
- Phylum: Arthropoda
- Subphylum: Chelicerata
- Class: Arachnida
- Order: Pseudoscorpiones
- Superfamily: Neobisioidea
- Family: Syarinidae; Chamberlin, 1930

= Syarinidae =

Family of pseudoscorpions

Syarinidae is a family of pseudoscorpions in the order Pseudoscorpiones. There are at least 20 genera and 110 described species in Syarinidae.

== Genera ==
These 20 genera belong to the family Syarinidae:

- Aglaochitra J. C. Chamberlin, 1952^{i c g}
- Alocobisium Beier, 1952^{i c g}
- Anysrius Harvey, 1998^{i c g}
- Arcanobisium Zaragoza, 2010^{g}
- Chitrella Beier, 1932^{i c g}
- Chitrellina Muchmore, 1996^{i c g}
- Hadoblothrus Beier, 1952^{i c g}
- Hyarinus J. C. Chamberlin, 1925^{i c g}
- Ideobisium Balzan, 1892^{i c g}
- Ideoblothrus Balzan, 1892^{i c g}
- Lusoblothrus Zaragoza & Reboleira, 2012^{g}
- Micracreagrella^{g}
- Micracreagrina^{g}
- Microblothrus Mahnert, 1985^{i c g}
- Microcreagrella Beier, 1961^{i c g}
- Microcreagrina Beier, 1961^{i c g}
- Nannobisium Beier, 1931^{i c g}
- Pararoncus J. C. Chamberlin, 1938^{i c g}
- Pseudoblothrus Beier, 1931^{i c g}
- Syarinus J. C. Chamberlin, 1925^{i c g b}

Data sources: i = ITIS, c = Catalogue of Life, g = GBIF, b = Bugguide.net
