= Pannawonica, Western Australia =

Pannawonica
- Town
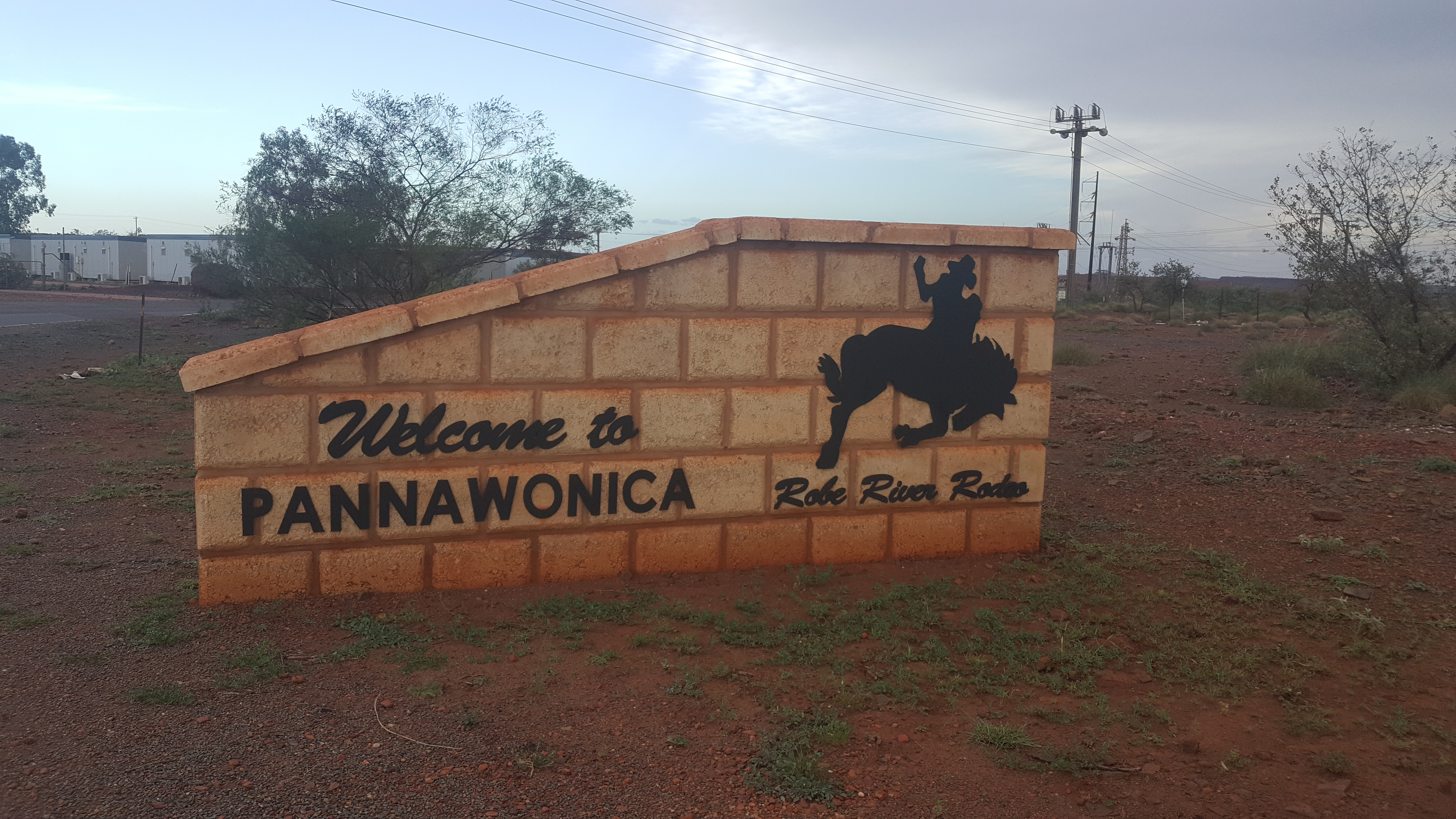

- Interactive map of Pannawonica
- Coordinates: 21°38′00″S 116°20′00″E
- Country: Australia
- State: Western Australia
- LGA: Shire of Ashburton
- Location: 1,429 km (888 mi) N of Perth; 198 km (123 mi) SSW of Karratha
- Established: 1970

Government
  - State electorate: Pilbara
  - Federal division: Durack

Area
  - Total: 27.6 km^{2} (10.7 sq mi)
- Elevation: 200 m (660 ft)

Population
  - Total: 685 (SAL 2021)
- Postcode: 6716
- Mean max temp: 34.6 °C (94.3 °F)
- Mean min temp: 19.5 °C (67.1 °F)
- Annual rainfall: 407.2 mm (16.03 in)

Pannawonica is an iron-ore mining town located in the Pilbara region of Western Australia, near the Robe River, about 200 km (120 mi) south-west from Karratha and 1,429 km (888 mi) North from Perth. At the 2021 census, Pannawonica had a population of 685.

In 2011 and again in 2016, it reportedly had the highest median weekly income of any town in Western Australia and most likely Australia, due to the high income of its mine workers.

== History ==
Pannawonica was built on Yalleen Station in 1970 by Cleveland-Cliffs Robe River Iron (it then became Robe River Iron Associates and was then bought out by Rio Tinto Iron Ore) it was gazetted as a townsite in 1972.

The township's name was derived from nearby Pannawonica Hill, named by a surveyor in 1885 after the corresponding Aboriginal place name which is said to mean "the hill that came from the sea". The traditional legend is that two local Aboriginal tribes were arguing over the ownership of the hill which was located by the sea. The sea spirit decided to resolve the dispute by moving the hill inland. As the hill was dragged over the land it left a deep indentation which became the Robe River.

Pannawonica is one of a number of remote-area iron-ore-mining towns built throughout the Pilbara to house workers operating open-cut mines and the loading of ore trains. It is a 'closed town', having limited facilities for visitors, the company's accommodation being reserved for its staff and visiting contractors. Some visitor accommodation is available at the Pannawonica Tavern.

Pannawonica is home to more than 1000 people: Rio Tinto Iron Ore employee families, staff on fly-in fly-out ('fifo') roster from Perth, and those involved in support services (49% residential, 51% FIFO). It is accessible by road, rail and light aircraft.

== Climate ==
Pannawonica has a hot desert climate (Köppen climate classification BWh), bordering on hot semi-arid climate (Köppen BSh). In summer, the days are very hot and the nights are warm. On average, there are 66.8 days per year where the temperature reaches 40 °C (104 °F). The record maximum temperature is 48.4 °C (119.1 °F) on 20 January 2003. Precipitation is highly variable. The wet season lasts from December to March, in which storms and tropical cyclones cause rainfall. In winter, the days are warm and the nights are mild. The record minimum temperature is 5.5 °C (41.9 °F) on 5 June 1973.

The Bureau of Meteorology's Pannawonica weather station opened in 1971. All recordings except rainfall closed in 2005. Rainfall is still being recorded as of 2020.

Climate data for Pannawonica
Month	Jan	Feb	Mar	Apr	May	Jun	Jul	Aug	Sep	Oct	Nov	Dec	Year
Record high °C (°F)	48.4 (119.1)	48.2 (118.8)	46.4 (115.5)	42.6 (108.7)	39.7 (103.5)	33.5 (92.3)	33.4 (92.1)	36.1 (97.0)	40.7 (105.3)	46.0 (114.8)	46.1 (115.0)	47.4 (117.3)	48.4 (119.1)
Mean daily maximum °C (°F)	41.0 (105.8)	39.7 (103.5)	38.5 (101.3)	35.8 (96.4)	30.6 (87.1)	27.0 (80.6)	26.7 (80.1)	28.8 (83.8)	32.4 (90.3)	36.1 (97.0)	38.5 (101.3)	40.5 (104.9)	34.6 (94.3)
Mean daily minimum °C (°F)	25.2 (77.4)	25.2 (77.4)	24.4 (75.9)	21.8 (71.2)	17.2 (63.0)	14.0 (57.2)	12.6 (54.7)	13.7 (56.7)	15.9 (60.6)	19.0 (66.2)	21.5 (70.7)	24.0 (75.2)	19.5 (67.1)
Record low °C (°F)	16.2 (61.2)	15.0 (59.0)	15.0 (59.0)	10.0 (50.0)	7.7 (45.9)	5.5 (41.9)	5.6 (42.1)	6.5 (43.7)	8.0 (46.4)	9.0 (48.2)	14.5 (58.1)	15.6 (60.1)	5.5 (41.9)
Average rainfall mm (inches)	81.4 (3.20)	103.7 (4.08)	72.9 (2.87)	19.1 (0.75)	26.7 (1.05)	34.7 (1.37)	15.0 (0.59)	7.0 (0.28)	1.3 (0.05)	1.8 (0.07)	6.9 (0.27)	30.0 (1.18)	407.2 (16.03)
Average precipitation days	7.9	9.0	6.9	2.7	3.1	3.5	2.6	1.5	0.5	0.5	1.0	3.9	43.1
Average afternoon relative humidity (%) (at 15:00)	26	33	28	26	31	33	27	22	19	16	17	21	25
Source: Bureau of Meteorology; Temperatures: 1971–2005; Rain data: 1971–2020; Relative humidity: 1971–2005

== Resident facilities ==
The town's facilities include a post office, supermarket, milk-bar, pub, a public swimming pool, sports fields, police station, petrol station, primary school, tavern bistro, gym and a free drive-in cinema with takeaway facility, free movies show on Friday and Sunday nights. Police officers based at Pannawonica supervise an area of approximately 33,800 km^{2} (13,100 sq mi).

The annual Pannawonica Robe River Rodeo, in September, attracts an average of 1500 people from all over Australia. Funds raised are distributed to many organisations including the Royal Flying Doctor Service, local school and other volunteer-based groups.

An annual Gala weekend held around August boasts a Gala Ball evening to raise funds for a Family Fun Day with children's rides and local stallholders showcase their wares.

Pannawonicas major local sports team is the Pannawonica Pythons, which in 2025 finished the year with an unbeaten record, most Notably winning the Exmouth masters football carnival.

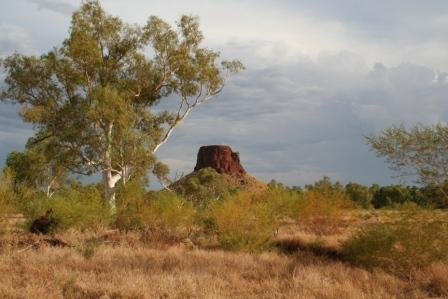
Pannawonica Hill

== Mining and loading ==
The Pannawonica residents work at the nearby Mesa J opened in 1992, Mesa A mines opened in 2010 and Warramboo which is still in development. Mesa is a Spanish word that means 'table', which describes the appearance of the flat-topped iron-ore plateaus standing high above the surrounding ground, remnants of terrain carved by an ancient river system.

The Robe Valley operation produces two pisolite (spheroidal crystalline) iron-ore products called Robe River Fines and Robe River Lump. The blasted high-grade ore is hauled directly to a train load-out. The sub-grade ore is washed and screened prior to loading onto trains that can stretch for 3 km (1.9 mi). Rio Tinto Iron Ore - Robe Valley transports about 32 million tonnes of iron ore per year via the company's private 200 km (120 mi) long rail line to its processing and port facilities at Cape Lambert, near the township of Wickham.
