= North West Australia =

Region of Western Australia

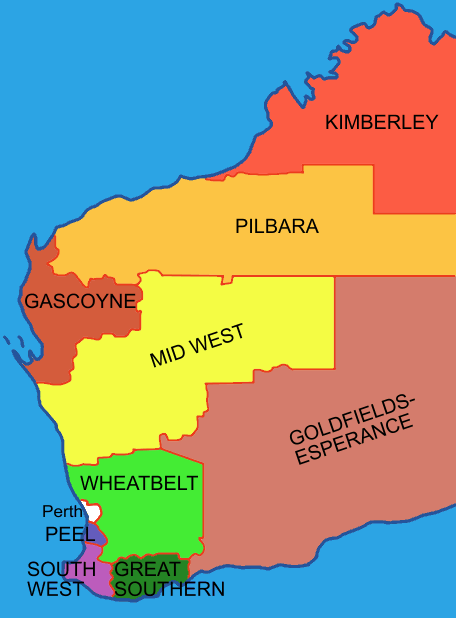
The official, legislated regions of Western Australia: the Pilbara, Kimberley and Gascoyne are often considered parts of the "North West".

The North West, North West Coast, North Western Australia and North West Australia, are usually informal names for the northern regions of the State of Western Australia. However, some conceptions of "North West Australia" have included adjoining parts of the Northern Territory (NT) – or even the entire NT (see below). It has been described as "best of outback".

Major offshore islands include Barrow Island, Monte Bello Islands and the Dampier Archipelago.

Apart from land areas, the term "North West" is also used for seabed oil and gas fields of the North West Shelf.

== Definitions ==
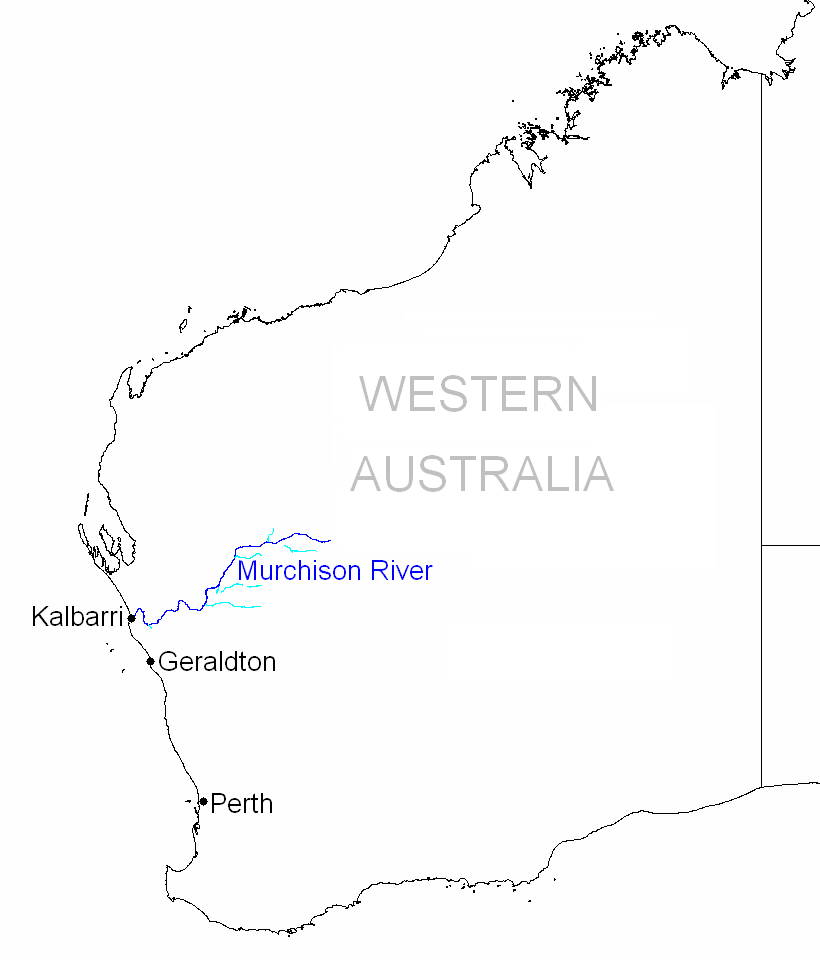
A map showing the location of the Murchison River.

The whole area north of the Murchison River was designated the North District by land regulations gazetted in 1862 by the government of the Colony of Western Australia. From February 1865, the North District was officially administered by a Government Resident, Robert John Sholl, initially based in Camden Harbour, then moved to Roebourne in November 1865.

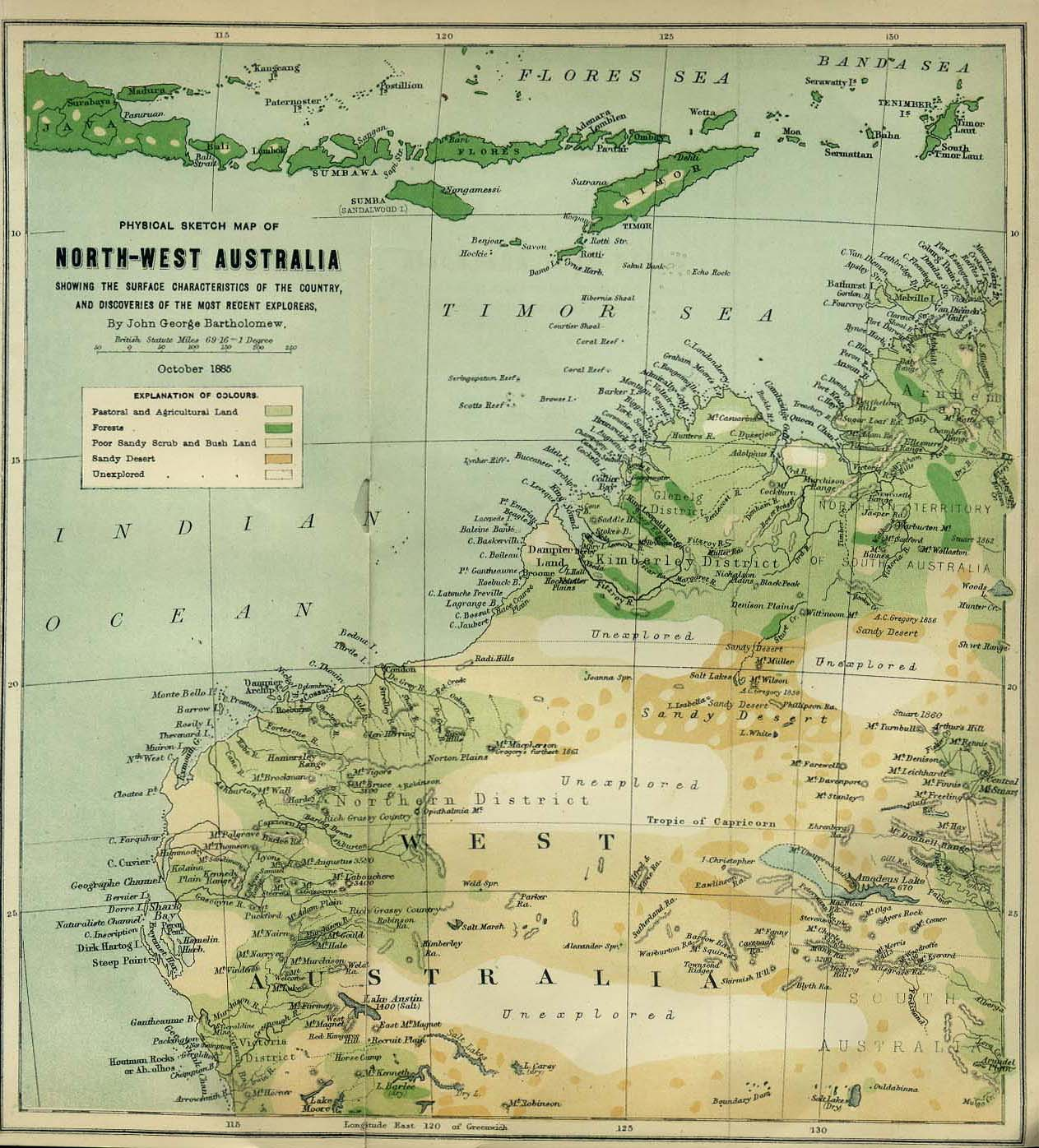
An 1885 map of "North-West Australia".

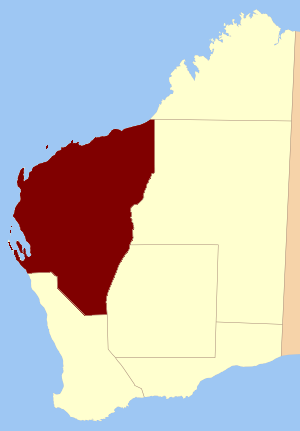
The official North-West Land Division, created in 1887.

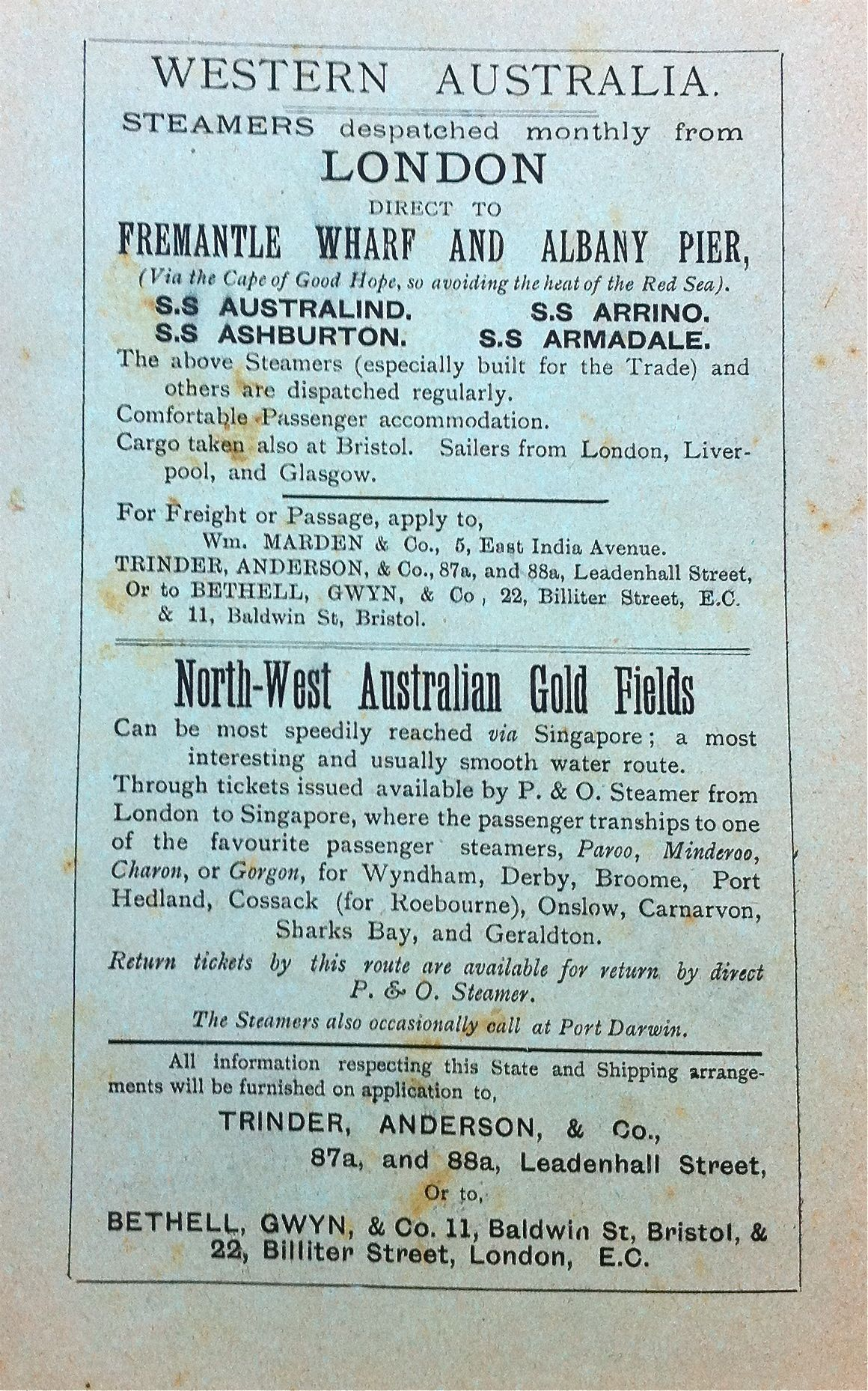
A 1910 advertisement for shipping services from London to the "North West Goldfields", which were in the Tanami Desert (Western Australia/Northern Territory).

The North-West Land Division, created by legislation in 1887, includes only the western Pilbara, northern Gascoyne and part of the Mid West, but not the Kimberley, thereby excluding many areas usually encompassed by popular definitions.

Western Australian law, state government policy and popular culture sometimes creates exceptions for the area "north of the 26th parallel" (latitude 26° south). For instance, a Western Australian Government Tourist Bureau publication, The North West of Western Australia (1963), both uses the 26th parallel as a boundary and delineates smaller regions: the Gascoyne, the "De Grey and Fortescue", the Kimberley and the "Dry Interior".

Two legislated regions of Western Australia, the Pilbara and Kimberley, may be considered to comprise an alternate, popular definition. The Gascoyne is often added to these, although it may also be considered as comprising a part of the "Greater Mid West".

During the 1960s, a pamphlet published by the State Government stated: "The region is bounded in the west by the Indian Ocean, in the east by the Central Division, in the north-east by the Pilbara, and in the south by the Northern Agricultural Division. It covers and area of 75,731 square miles (196,140 km^{2}) and has a population of about 10,000."

It has frequently been proposed that the region, alone or amalgamated with the Northern Territory, should form a new Australian state. The most recent proponent of such a scheme was Federal MP Bob Katter, who suggested that such a state should be called "North Western Australia".

== Western Australian north west frontier ==
The north west has been often designated as a "frontier", or even the "last frontier" in Western Australian history, and in air transport in the 1920s and 1930s the region was designated as such.

== Cyclone zone ==
The region has also acquired a reputation as being vulnerable to regular and devastating cyclones, with impact on mineral and oil operations.

== Church dioceses ==
The Anglican and Catholic churches have Geraldton as the base for the north west, the Anglican church used the North West name, while the Catholic diocese is known by the name of the town.

== See also ==
- Southwest, Western Australia
- Northern Australia
- Central Australia
- Southern Australia
