= List of Thelyphonidae species =

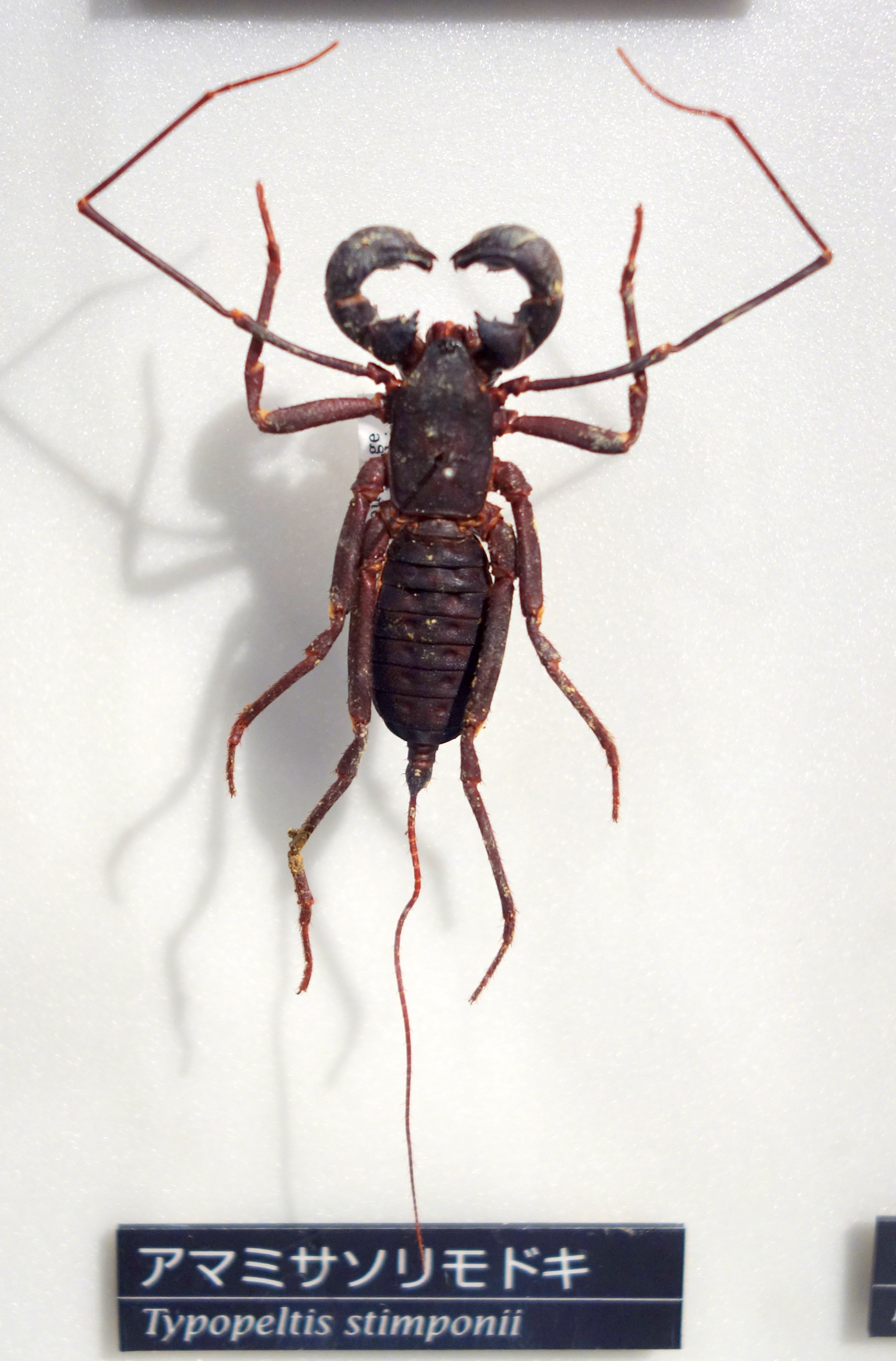
Typopeltis stimpsonii

This is a list of all described species of Thelyphonidae, adapted from World Uropygi Catalog in 2022.

== List ==
- Etienneus Heurtault, 1984

- Etienneus africanus (Hentschel, 1899) — Africa

- Ginosigma Speijer, 1936

- Ginosigma lombokensis Speijer, 1936 — Indonesia
- Ginosigma schimkewitschi (Tarnani, 1894) — Cambodia, Laos, Malaysia, Singapore, Thailand, Vietnam

- Glyptogluteus Rowland, 1973

- Glyptogluteus angustus Rowland, 1973 — Philippines

- Hypoctonus Thorell, 1888

- Hypoctonus andersoni (Oates, 1889) — Myanmar
- Hypoctonus binghami (Oates, 1889) — Myanmar
- Hypoctonus birmanicus Hirst, 1911 — Myanmar
- Hypoctonus browni Gravely, 1912 — Myanmar
- Hypoctonus carmichaeli Gravely, 1916 — Bangladesh
- Hypoctonus dawnae Gravely, 1912 — Myanmar
- Hypoctonus ellisi Gravely, 1912 — Myanmar
- Hypoctonus formosus (Butler, 1872) — Myanmar
- Hypoctonus gastrostictus Kraepelin, 1897 — Borneo
- Hypoctonus granosus Pocock, 1900 — China
- Hypoctonus javanicus Speijer, 1933 — Indonesia
- Hypoctonus kraepelini Simon, 1901 — Thailand
- Hypoctonus oatesii Pocock, 1900 — Bangladesh, Bhutan
- Hypoctonus rangunensis (Oates, 1889) — Myanmar
- Hypoctonus saxatilis (Oates, 1889) — Myanmar
- Hypoctonus siamensis Haupt, 1996 — Thailand
- Hypoctonus stoliczkae Gravely, 1912 — India
- Hypoctonus sylvaticus (Oates, 1889) — Myanmar
- Hypoctonus woodmasoni (Oates, 1889) — Myanmar

- Labochirus Pocock, 1894

- Labochirus cervinus Pocock, 1899 — India
- Labochirus proboscideus (Butler, 1872) — Sri Lanka
- Labochirus tauricornis Pocock, 1900 — India

- Mastigoproctus Pocock, 1894

- Mastigoproctus abeli Villarreal & Giupponi, 2009 — Venezuela
- Mastigoproctus annectens Werner, 1916 — Brazil
- Mastigoproctus ayalai Viquez & Armas, 2007 — Venezuela
- Mastigoproctus baracoensis Franganillo, 1931 — Cuba
- Mastigoproctus brasilianus (C. L. Koch, 1843) — Brazil
- Mastigoproctus butleri Pocock, 1894 — Brazil
- Mastigoproctus cinteotl Barrales-Alcalá, Francke & Prendini, 2018 — Mexico
- Mastigoproctus colombianus Mello-Leitão, 1940 — Colombia
- Mastigoproctus floridanus Lönnberg, 1897 — United States
- Mastigoproctus formidabilis Hirst, 1912 — Venezuela
- Mastigoproctus giganteus (Lucas, 1835) — United States, Mexico
- Mastigoproctus lacandonensis Ballesteros & Francke, 2006 — Mexico
- Mastigoproctus maximus (Tarnani, 1889) — Brazil
- Mastigoproctus minensis Mello-Leitão, 1931 — Brazil
- Mastigoproctus perditus Mello-Leitão, 1931 — Brazil
- Mastigoproctus proscorpio (Latreille, 1806) — Hispaniola (Dominican Republic, Haiti), Martinique
- Mastigoproctus santiago Teruel, 2010 — Cuba
- Mastigoproctus vandevenderi Barrales-Alcalá, Francke & Prendini, 2018 — Mexico

- Mayacentrum Víquez & Armas, 2006

- Mayacentrum guatemalae Víquez & Armas, 2006 — Belize, Guatemala
- Mayacentrum pijol Víquez & Armas, 2006 — Guatemala, Honduras
- Mayacentrum tantalus (Roewer, 1954) — El Salvador, Guatemala

- Mimoscorpius Pocock, 1894

- Mimoscorpius pugnator (Butler, 1872) — Guatemala

- Ravilops Víquez & Armas, 2005

- Ravilops kovariki Teruel, 2017 — Hispaniola (Dominican Republic)
- Ravilops wetherbeei (Armas, 2002) — Hispaniola (Dominican Republic)

- Thelyphonellus Pocock, 1894

- Thelyphonellus amazonicus (Butler, 1872) — Brazil, Suriname
- Thelyphonellus ruschii Weygoldt, 1979 — Guyana
- Thelyphonellus vanegasae Giupponi & Vasconcelos, 2008 — Colombia
- Thelyphonellus venezolanus Haupt, 2009 — Venezuela

- Thelyphonoides Krehenwinkel, Curio, Tacud & Haupt, 2009

- Thelyphonoides panayensis Krehenwinkel, Curio, Tacud & Haupt, 2009 — Philippines

- Thelyphonus Latreille, 1802

- Thelyphonus ambonensis (Speijer, 1933) — Indonesia
- Thelyphonus angustus Lucas, 1835 — Unknown, possibly Indo-Australian
- Thelyphonus anthracinus Pocock, 1894 — Malaysia
- Thelyphonus asperatus Thorell, 1888 — Indonesia
- Thelyphonus billitonensis Speijer, 1931 — Indonesia
- Thelyphonus borneensis Kraepelin, 1897 — Borneo
- Thelyphonus borneonus Haupt, 2009 — Borneo
- Thelyphonus burchardi Kraepelin, 1911 — Indonesia
- Thelyphonus caudatus (Linnaeus, 1758) — Vietnam, Indonesia
- Thelyphonus celebensis Kraepelin, 1897 — Indonesia
- Thelyphonus dammermanni (Speijer, 1933) — Indonesia
- Thelyphonus dicranotarsalis (Rowland, 1973) — Papua New Guinea
- Thelyphonus doriae Thorell, 1888 — Malaysia
- Thelyphonus feuerborni Werner, 1932 — Java
- Thelyphonus florensis (Speijer, 1933) — Indonesia
- Thelyphonus gertschi (Rowland, 1973) — Papua New Guinea
- Thelyphonus grandis Speijer, 1931 — Borneo
- Thelyphonus hansenii Kraeplein, 1897 — Philippines
- Thelyphonus insulanus L.Koch & Keyserling, 1885 — Fiji
- Thelyphonus kinabaluensis Speijer, 1933 — Malaysia
- Thelyphonus klugii Kraepelin, 1897 — Indonesia
- Thelyphonus kopsteini (Speijer, 1933) — Indonesia
- Thelyphonus kraepelini Speijer, 1931 — Indonesia
- Thelyphonus lawrencei Rowland, 1973 — Solomon Islands
- Thelyphonus leucurus Pocock, 1898 — Solomons
- Thelyphonus linganus C.L.Koch, 1843 — Indonesia, Malaysia
- Thelyphonus lucanoides Butler, 1872 — Indonesia, Sarawak
- Thelyphonus luzonicus Haupt, 2009 — Philippines
- Thelyphonus manilanus C.L. Koch, 1843 — Indonesia, Papua New Guinea, Philippines, Thailand
- Thelyphonus nasutus (Thorell, 1888) — Borneo
- Thelyphonus pococki Tarnani, 1900 — Indonesia
- Thelyphonus renschi (Speijer, 1936) — Borneo
- Thelyphonus rohdei (Kraepelin, 1897) — Indonesia, Papua New Guinea
- Thelyphonus samoanus (Kraepelin, 1897) — Samoa
- Thelyphonus schnehagenii Kraepelin, 1897 — Burma
- Thelyphonus semperi Kraepelin, 1897 — Philippines
- Thelyphonus sepiaris Butler, 1873 — India, Sri Lanka
- Thelyphonus seticauda Doleschall, 1857 — Indonesia, Philippines
- Thelyphonus spinimanus Lucas, 1835 — unknown
- Thelyphonus suckii Kraepelin, 1897 — Indonesia
- Thelyphonus sumatranus Kraepelin, 1897 — Indonesia
- Thelyphonus tarnanii Pocock, 1894 — Sumatra
- Thelyphonus vanoorti Speijer, 1936 — Philippines
- Thelyphonus wayi Pocock, 1900 — Cambodia
- Thelyphonus willeyi (Pocock, 1898) — Papua New Guinea

- Typopeltis Pocock, 1894

- Typopeltis cantonensis Speijer, 1936 — China
- Typopeltis crucifer Pocock, 1894 — Japan, Taiwan
- Typopeltis dalyi Pocock, 1900 — Thailand
- Typopeltis guangxiensis Haupt & Song, 1996 — China
- Typopeltis harmandi Kraepelin, 1900 — Vietnam
- Typopeltis kasnakowi Tarnani, 1900 — Thailand
- Typopeltis laurentianus Seraphim, Giupponi & Miranda, 2019 — Vietnam
- Typopeltis magnificus Haupt, 2004 — Laos
- Typopeltis niger (Tarnani, 1894) — China
- Typopeltis soidaoensis Haupt, 1996 — Thailand, Vietnam
- Typopeltis stimpsonii (Wood, 1862) — Japan
- Typopeltis tarnanii Pocock, 1902 — Thailand
- Typopeltis vanoorti (Speijer, 1936) — China

- Uroproctus Pocock, 1894

- Uroproctus assamensis (Stoliczka, 1869) — Bangladesh, Bhutan, Cambodia, India, Nepal

- Valeriophonus Víquez & Armas, 2005

- Valeriophonus nara (Valerio, 1981) — Costa Rica

- †Mesoproctus Dunlop, 1998

- Mesoproctus rowlandi Dunlop, 1998

- †Mesothelyphonus Cai & Huang, 2017

- Mesothelyphonus parvus Cai & Huang, 2017
