= List of lesser arachnids of Sri Lanka =

Sri Lanka is a tropical island situated close to the southern tip of India. The invertebrate fauna is as large as it is common to other regions of the world. There are about 2 million species of arthropods found in the world, and still counting. So many new species are discover up to this time also. So it is very complicated and difficult to summarize the exact number of species found within a certain region.

The following list provide the whip spiders, whip scorpions and daddy longlegs in Sri Lanka.

== Whip spiders ==
Phylum: Arthropoda
Class: Arachnida
Order: Amblypygi

Whip spiders, also known as tailless whip scorpions, are harmless arachnids that are clearly identified by the absence of tail, with broad and highly flattened body. Amblypygids have raptorial pedipalps, equipped with long spines. First pair of legs are modified as antennae-like feelers giving whip-like appearance. They walk in crab-like, sideways movements. All amblypygi are harmless to humans. There are about 155 species of whip spiders described within 5 families and 17 genera. In Sri Lanka, only three species can be found, belonging to a single genus.

=== Family: Phrynichidae ===
- Phrynichus ceylonicus (C. L. Koch, 1843)
- Phrynichus pusillus (Pocock, 1894)
  - Phrynichus pusillus gracillibrachiatus
- Phrynichus reniformis (Linnaeus, 1758)

== Whip scorpions ==
Phylum: Arthropoda
Class: Arachnida
Order: Uropygi (Thelyphonida s.s.)

Whip scorpions, also known as vinegaroons, are clearly identified by the presence of a whip-like tail. First pair of legs are modified as antennae. They have very large scorpion-like pedipalps, with an additional large spine on each palpal tibia. When threatened, they emit vinegar-like smell offensive liquid from glands near the rear of their abdomen. There are about 100 species of whip scorpions described within 15 genera, included to a single family. In Sri Lanka, only two species can be found, belong to two genera.

=== Family: Thelyphonidae ===
- Labochirus proboscideus (Butler, 1872)
- Thelyphonus sepiaris (Butler, 1873)

== Short-tailed whipscorpions ==
Phylum: Arthropoda
Class: Arachnida
Order: Schizomida

Short-tailed whipscorpions, also known as Schizomids are relatively small, soft-bodied arachnids, with two-segmented bodies. Prosoma divided into three segments - protopeltidium, mesopeltidia and metapeltidia. Opisthosoma is divided into 12 recognizable segments. Last opisthosoma segment bears a short whip-like tail. The order consists two extant families, where Sri Lanka comprised with two species in a single family.

=== Family: Hubbardiidae ===
- Schizomus crassicaudatus (O. P.-cambridge, 1872)
- Schizomus peradeniyensis (Gravely, 1911)

== Camel spiders ==
Phylum: Arthropoda
Class: Arachnida
Order: Solifugae

Camel spiders, also known as wind scorpions or sun spiders are not true relatives of true scorpions or spiders however. Body divides into two regions as in other arachnids. They have conspicuously large two chelicerae. They do not have a tail. More than 1000 species of crab spiders described under 153 genera and 12 families. In Sri Lanka only one species can be found.

=== Family: Rhagodidae ===
- Rhagodes phipsoni (Pocock, 1895)

== Daddy longlegs ==
Phylum: Arthropoda
Class: Arachnida
Order: Opiliones

Daddy longlegs, also known as harvestmen are not true relatives of spiders however. Body divides into two regions as in other arachnids. With name implies, they are characterized by exceptionally long legs relative to their body size. They show broad connection between the cephalothorax and abdomen, which clearly differentiate them from spiders. More than 6,500 species of daddy longlegs described under 5 suborders. In Sri Lanka 21 species can be found under five families. The pettalid genus Pettalus Thorell, 1876 is now known to have three described and many undescribed species in Sri Lanka according to Hansen & Sørensen, 1904; Sharma & Giribet, 2006.

=== Family: Assamiidae ===
- Assamia gravelyi (Roewer, 1911)
- Vandarawella bicolor (Roewer, 1935)

=== Family: Pettalidae ===
- Pettalus brevicauda (Pocock, 1897)
- Pettalus cimiciformis (O.pickard-cambridge, 1875)
- Pettalus lampetides Sharma & Giribet 2006

=== Family: Podoctidae ===
- Eupodoctis annulatipes (Roewer, 1912)
- Eurytromma pictulus (Pocock, 1903)
- Eusitalces parvulus (Roewer, 1915)
- Neopodoctis ceylonensis (Roewer, 1912)
- Neopodoctis taprobanicus (Hirst, 1912)

=== Family: Sclerosomatidae ===
- Eugagrella ceylonensis (Roewer, 1954)
- Gagrella bicolor (Roewer, 1915)
- Gagrella biseriata (Simon, 1901)
- Gagrella ceylonensis (Karsch, 1891)
  - Gagrella ceylonensis bispinosa (Karsch, 1891)
- Gagrella rubra (Roewer, 1910)
- Gagrella triangularis (With, 1903)
- Gagrellula vittata (Roewer, 1912)
- Psathyropus cuprilucida (Roewer, 1954)

=== Family: Trionyxellidae ===
- Kandyca minima (Roewer, 1915)
- Nuwaria granulata (Roewer, 1915)
- Trionyxella clavipus (Roewer, 1912)
