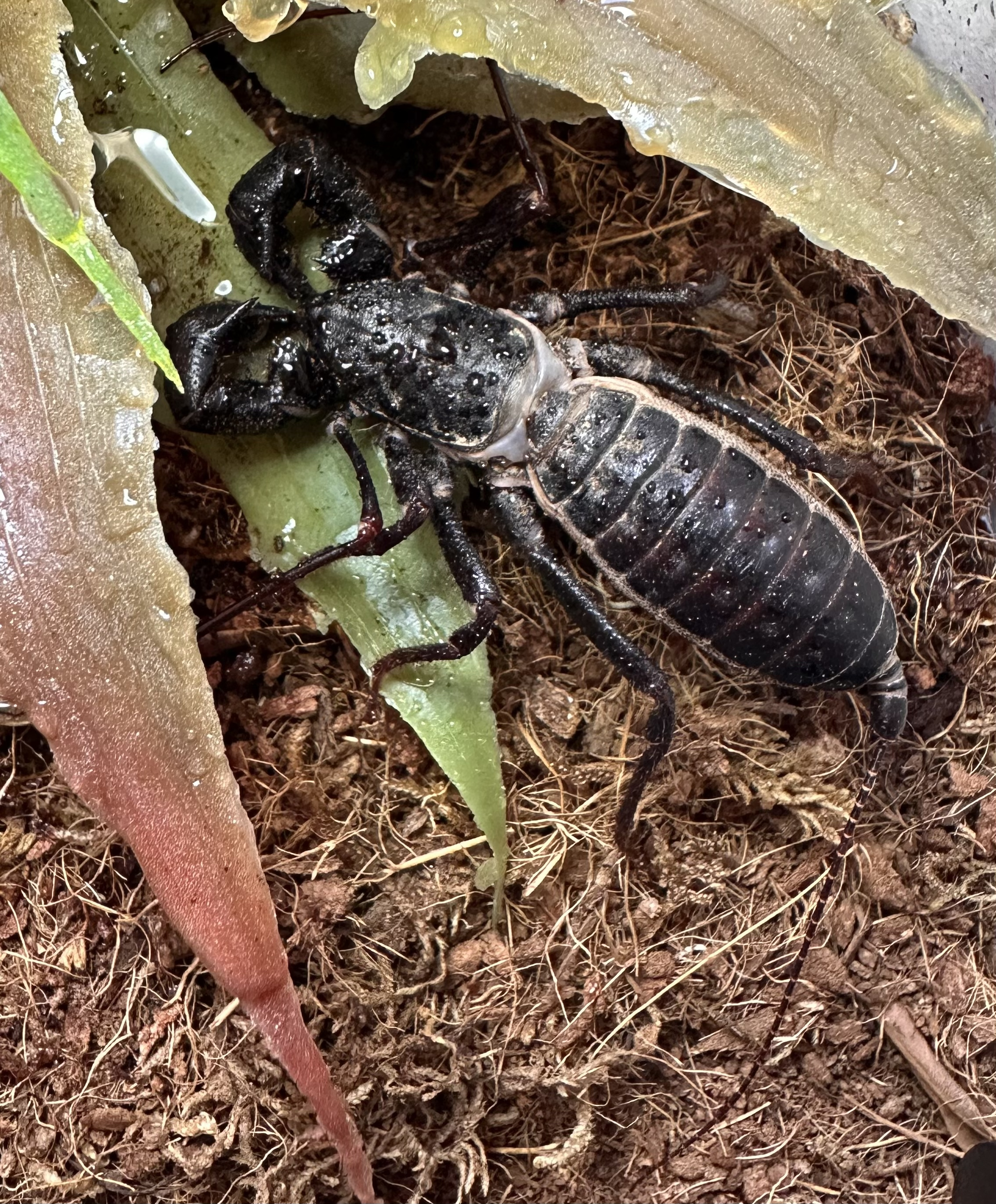

Scientific classification
- Kingdom: Animalia
- Phylum: Arthropoda
- Subphylum: Chelicerata
- Class: Arachnida
- Order: Uropygi
- Family: Thelyphonidae
- Genus: Mastigoproctus
- Species: M. tohono

Binomial name
- Mastigoproctus tohono Barrales-Alcalá, Francke & Prendini, 2018

= Mastigoproctus tohono =

Tohono whip scorpion

Species of whip scorpion

Mastigoproctus tohono, also known as the Tohono whipscorpion or Tohono vinegaroon, is a species of whip scorpions in the family Uropygi. Its native range is from northern Sonora in Mexico to southern Arizona and western New Mexico, with most sightings occurring in the Chiricahua and Huachuca Mountains of Cochise County, Arizona.

== Taxonomy ==
Mastigoproctus tohono was first described in 2018 by Diego Barrales-Alcalá, Oscar F. Francke, and Lorenzo Prendini. M. tohono was originally believed to be a local varietal of Mastigoproctus giganteus, but research found that certain biological characteristics (including differing areas of setae frequency and epistoma positioning) warranted a reclassification of certain local varietals of M. giganteus into newly classified species.

Etymologically, the binomial name of Mastigoproctus tohono is derived from Greek and O'odham origins. Mastigoproctus, deriving from the Greek "μαστίγιο", meaning whip or scourge, and "πρωκτός", meaning anus or posterior, highlights the defensive tail of Uropygi. Tohono is derived from the Tohono O'odham people who have lived in the native range of the species in southern Arizona and northern Sonora.

== Description ==
The species grows 56 to 59 mm long (2.2 to 2.3 inches), excluding the tail. Their carapace varies from a dark reddish brown to black, while their antenniform front legs are typically reddish brown.

Commonly known as the Tohono whip scorpion, M. tohono is a species of Uropygid characterized by its distinct morphology and defensive capabilities. It has six legs used for walking, along with two antenniform front legs covered with sensitive setae that serve as sensory organs to detect prey and vibrations. Its pedipalps are modified claw-like structures used for capturing and crushing prey. The species also possesses a long, thin, whip-like tail, from which it derives one of its common names. The species has eight eyes: a pair on the front of the head and three smaller eyes on each side. However, its vision is extremely poor, and it primarily relies on its elongated front legs, tail, and pedipalps to navigate and sense its environment.

As a defense mechanism, Mastigoproctus tohono can spray a substance composed of acetic acid from the base of its tail, which can injure the exoskeleton of invertebrates and irritate the eyes and nose of vertebrate predators. This chemical produces a strong vinegar-like odor, earning this species the common name "vinegaroon".
