= Minbosius =

Scientific classification
- Kingdom: Animalia
- Phylum: Arthropoda
- Subphylum: Chelicerata
- Class: Arachnida
- Order: Thelyphonida
- Genus: Minbosius; Speijer, 1933

Genus of arachnids

Minbosius is a genus of whip scorpions. They are found in the Philippines, the Moluccas, and New Guinea.

== Description ==
Whip scorpions of the Minbosius genus are characterized by unmodified tarsal segments of the female's first leg, the unmodified patellar apophysis of the male's pedipalp, the modified abdominal sterna II and III, the presence of two ommatoids, and a well-developed keel.

== Taxonomy ==
Minbosius contains the following species:

- Minbosius manilanus
- Minbosius kopsteini

Minbosius is currently regarded as a junior synonym of Thelyphonus Latreille, 1802.
