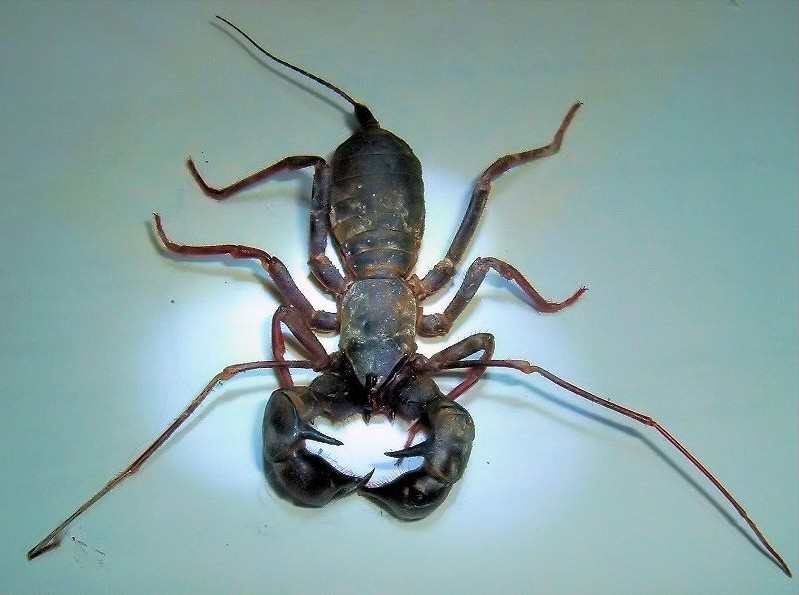

Scientific classification
- Kingdom: Animalia
- Phylum: Arthropoda
- Subphylum: Chelicerata
- Class: Arachnida
- Order: Uropygi
- Family: Thelyphonidae
- Genus: Mastigoproctus
- Species: M. colombianus

Binomial name
- Mastigoproctus colombianus Mello-Leitão, 1940

= Mastigoproctus colombianus =

Species of whip scorpion

Mastigoproctus colombianus is a whip scorpion species found in Colombia, South America, near west deserts areas.

== Description ==
Mastigoproctus colombianus range from 45 to 65 millimetres (1.8 to 2.6 in) in length. Color brown and red-end legs.

Like the related orders Schizomida, Amblypygi and Solifugae, uropygids use only six legs for walking, having modified their first two legs to serve as antennae-like sensory organs. Whip scorpions have no venom glands, but they do have glands near the rear of their abdomen that can spray a combination of acetic acid and octanoic acid when they are bothered. The acetic acid gives this spray a vinegar-like smell, giving rise to the common name vinegaroon.

== Behaviour ==
Whip scorpions are carnivorous, nocturnal hunters feeding mostly on insects and millipedes, but sometimes on worms and slugs.

== Habitat ==
Mastigoproctus colombianus are found in tropical and subtropical areas of Colombia. They usually dig burrows with their pedipalps, to which they transport their prey. They may also burrow under logs, rotting wood, rocks, and other natural debris. They enjoy humid, dark places and avoid the light.

== See also ==
- List of Thelyphonidae species
