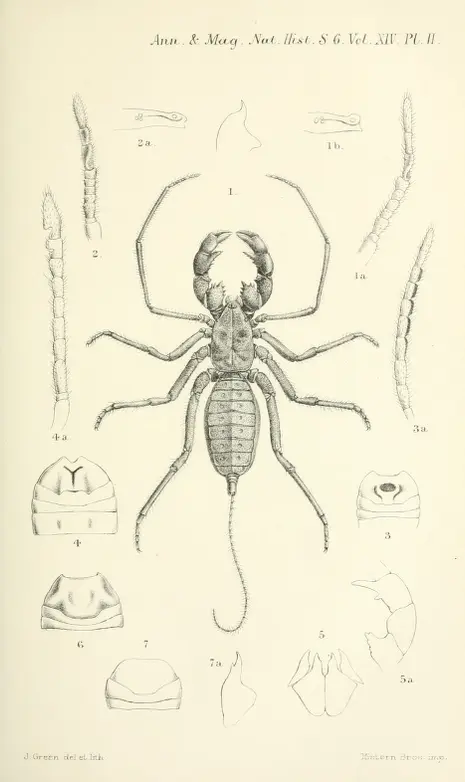

Scientific classification
- Kingdom: Animalia
- Phylum: Arthropoda
- Subphylum: Chelicerata
- Class: Arachnida
- Order: Uropygi
- Family: Thelyphonidae
- Genus: Mimoscorpius; Pocock, 1894
- Species: M. pugnator

Binomial name
- Mimoscorpius pugnator (Butler, 1872)

Synonyms
- Thelyphonus pugnator Mastigoproctus liochirus

= Mimoscorpius =

Genus of whip scorpions

Mimoscorpius is a monotypic genus of Thelyphonid whip scorpions, first described by Reginald Innes Pocock in 1894. Its single species, Mimoscorpius pugnator is distributed in southern Guatemala.

== Morphology ==
Mimoscorpious pugnator has a black carapace with a bright red-orange ventral surface, reddish-brown legs and pedipalps, and a red-orange flagellum covered in fine hairs (setae). Collected specimens have ranged from 3.4 — 4.6cm long. The pedipalps of the male are longer than those of the female.

== Distribution ==
All of the six known specimens have been collected from Guatemala: five from El Papayo and one from Peña Blanca. It inhabits subtropical forests at an elevation of around 270m above sea level.

== Natural history ==
Mimoscorpious pugnator takes refuge in and under rotten logs, in holes at the bases of trees, and in the burrows of agoutis and armadillos. Multiple individuals may share a shelter. M. pugnator also shares shelters with schizomids.

Like other whip scorpions, M. pugnator releases a chemical spray when threatened, the odor of which is similar to that of acetic acid (from which whip scorpions derive their other common name, vinegaroons).

== Description and taxonomy ==
Mimoscorpius pugnator was described by the English entomologist Arthur Gardiner Butler in 1872 as Thelyphonus pugnator based on a male specimen. The holotype is held in the Natural History Museum in London. It was recorded as having been collected from the Philippines; this is now thought to be an error based on the collection of a further specimen from Guatemala and the morphologic similarity of the species to Central American whip scorpions. Though the etymology of the species name is not remarked upon in the original description, it likely derives from the Latin pūgnātor, meaning fighter or combatant.

The British zoologist Reginald Innes Pocock re-described the species as the sole member of the new genus Mimoscorpius in 1984. The female of the species was described in 2008.
