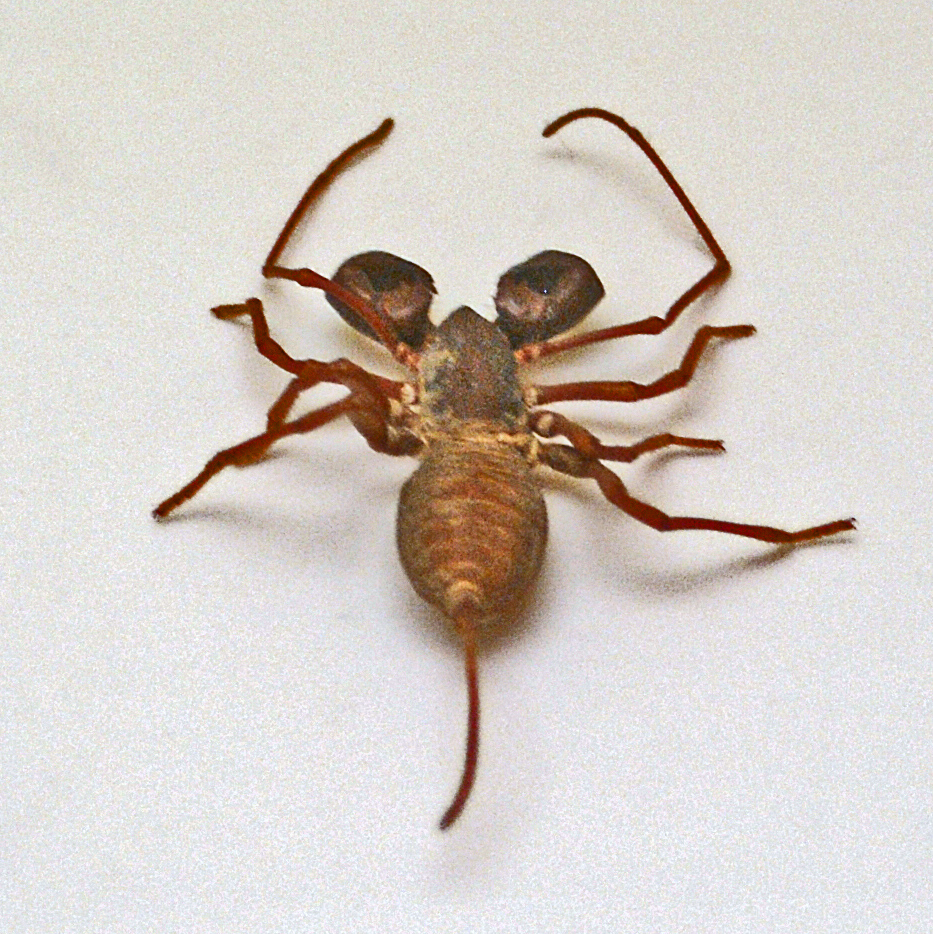
- Hypoctonus formosus from Myanmar

Scientific classification
- Domain: Eukaryota
- Kingdom: Animalia
- Phylum: Arthropoda
- Subphylum: Chelicerata
- Class: Arachnida
- Order: Uropygi
- Family: Thelyphonidae
- Genus: Hypoctonus
- Species: H. formosus

Binomial name
- Hypoctonus formosus (Butler, 1872)

Synonyms
- Thelyphonus formosus Butler, 1872

= Hypoctonus formosus =

Species of whip scorpion

Hypoctonus formosus is a species of arachnids belonging to the family Thelyphonidae.

== Subspecies ==
- Hypoctonus formosus formosus (Bulter, 1872)
- Hypoctonus formosus insularis (Oates, 1889)

== Distribution ==
This species is endemic to Myanmar.
