= Schizomus greeni =

Scientific classification
- Domain: Eukaryota
- Kingdom: Animalia
- Phylum: Arthropoda
- Subphylum: Chelicerata
- Class: Arachnida
- Order: Schizomida
- Family: Hubbardiidae
- Genus: Schizomus
- Species: S. greeni

Binomial name
- Schizomus greeni Gravely, 1912

Species of whipscorpion

Schizomus greeni is a species of short-tailed whipscorpions of the genus Schizomus that belong to the family Hubbardiidae of Arachnids.
