= Sheylayongium =

Scientific classification
- Domain: Eukaryota
- Kingdom: Animalia
- Phylum: Arthropoda
- Subphylum: Chelicerata
- Class: Arachnida
- Order: Uropygi
- Family: Thelyphonidae
- Subfamily: Mastigoproctinae
- Genus: Sheylayongium; Teruel, 2018
- Species: S. pelegrini

Binomial name
- Sheylayongium pelegrini (Armas, 2000)

Synonyms
- Mastigoproctus pelegrini Armas, 2000

Genus of whip scorpions

Sheylayongium is a monotypic genus of Thelyphonid whip scorpions, first described by Rolando Teruel in 2018. Its single species, Sheylayongium pelegrini is distributed in Cuba.
