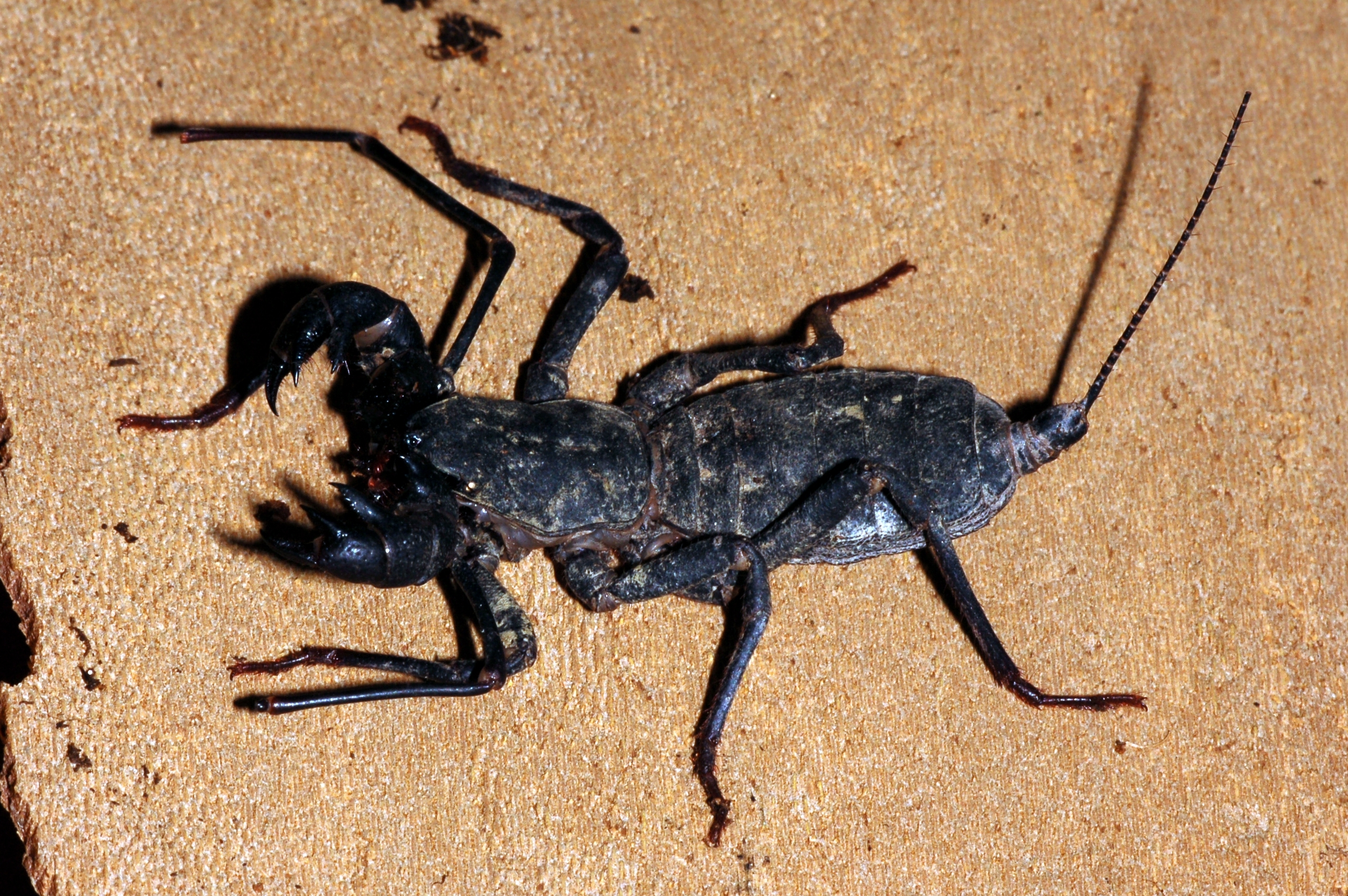
- Typopeltis sp. (Museum of Wiesbaden)

Scientific classification
- Domain: Eukaryota
- Kingdom: Animalia
- Phylum: Arthropoda
- Subphylum: Chelicerata
- Class: Arachnida
- Order: Uropygi
- Family: Thelyphonidae
- Subfamily: Typopeltinae
- Genus: Typopeltis; Pocock, 1894

Type species
- Typopeltis crucifer Pocock, 1894

Species
- 13, see text

Synonyms
- Gipopeltis Speijer, 1934; Teltus Speijer, 1936

= Typopeltis =

Genus of whip scorpions

Typopeltis is an Asian genus of whip scorpions or 'vinegaroons' and currently the only member of subfamily Typopeltinae.

== Species ==
As of October 2022, the World Uropygi Catalog accepts the following thirteen species:

- Typopeltis cantonensis Speijer, 1936 – China
- Typopeltis crucifer Pocock, 1894 – Japan, Taiwan
- Typopeltis dalyi Pocock, 1900 – Thailand
- Typopeltis guangxiensis Haupt & Song, 1996 – China
- Typopeltis harmandi Kraepelin, 1900 – Vietnam
- Typopeltis kasnakowi Tarnani, 1900 – Thailand
- Typopeltis laurentianus Seraphim, Giupponi & Miranda, 2019 – Vietnam
- Typopeltis magnificus Haupt, 2004 – Laos
- Typopeltis niger (Tarnani, 1894) – China
- Typopeltis soidaoensis Haupt, 1996 – Thailand, Vietnam
- Typopeltis stimpsonii (Wood, 1862) – Japan
- Typopeltis tarnanii Pocock, 1902 – Thailand
- Typopeltis vanoorti (Speijer, 1936) – China

== Gallery ==
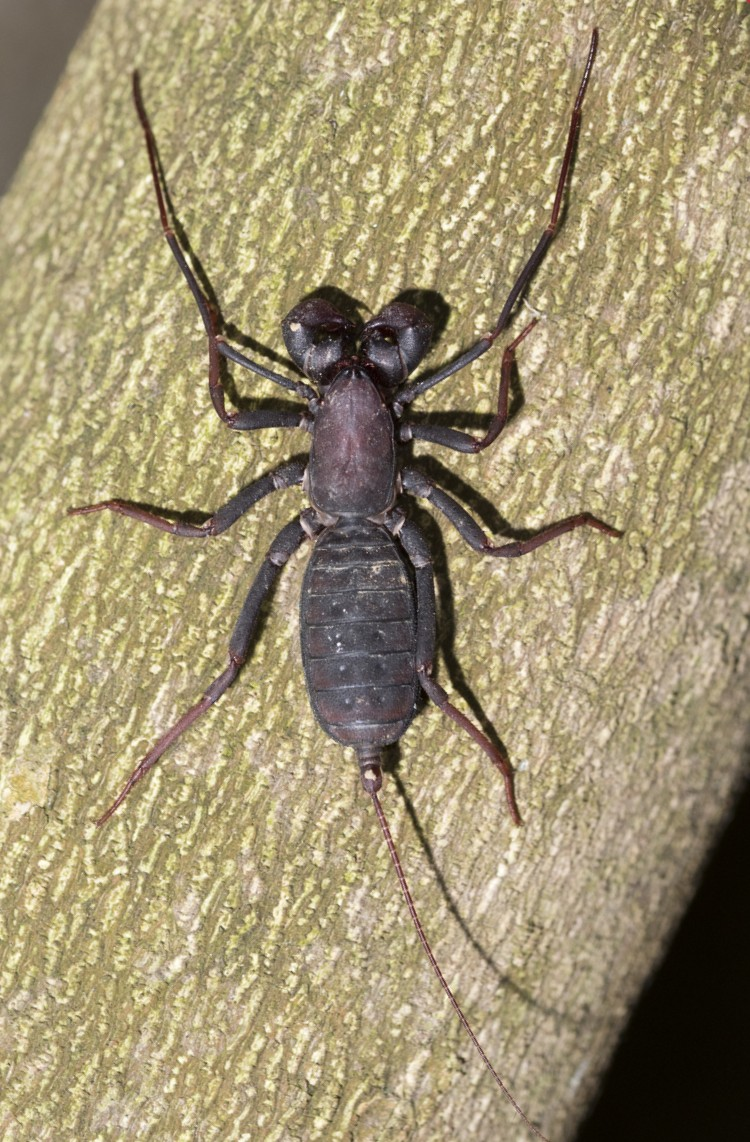
Typopeltis crucifer

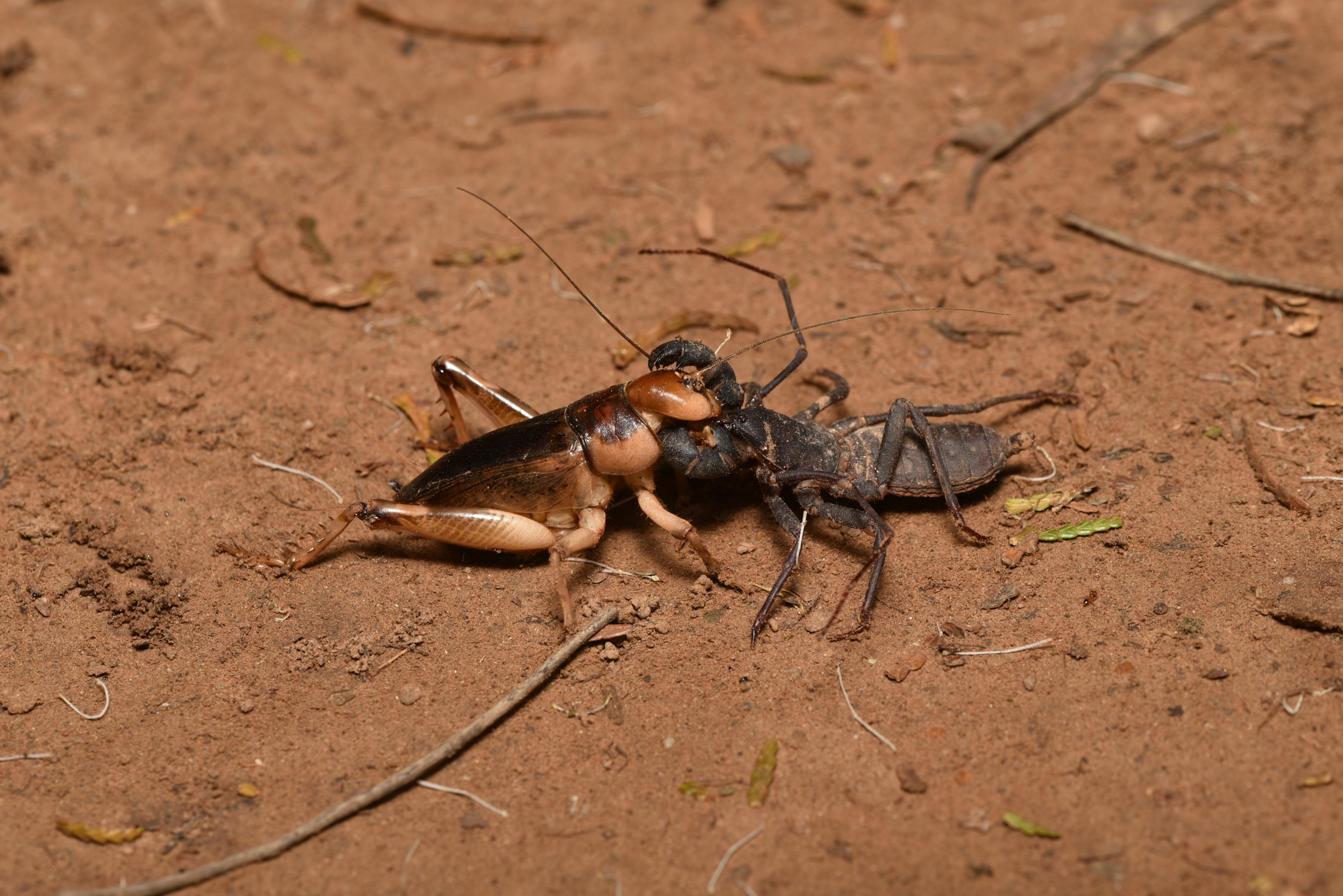
T. crucifer hunting (unsuccessfully) Tarbinskiellus portentosus

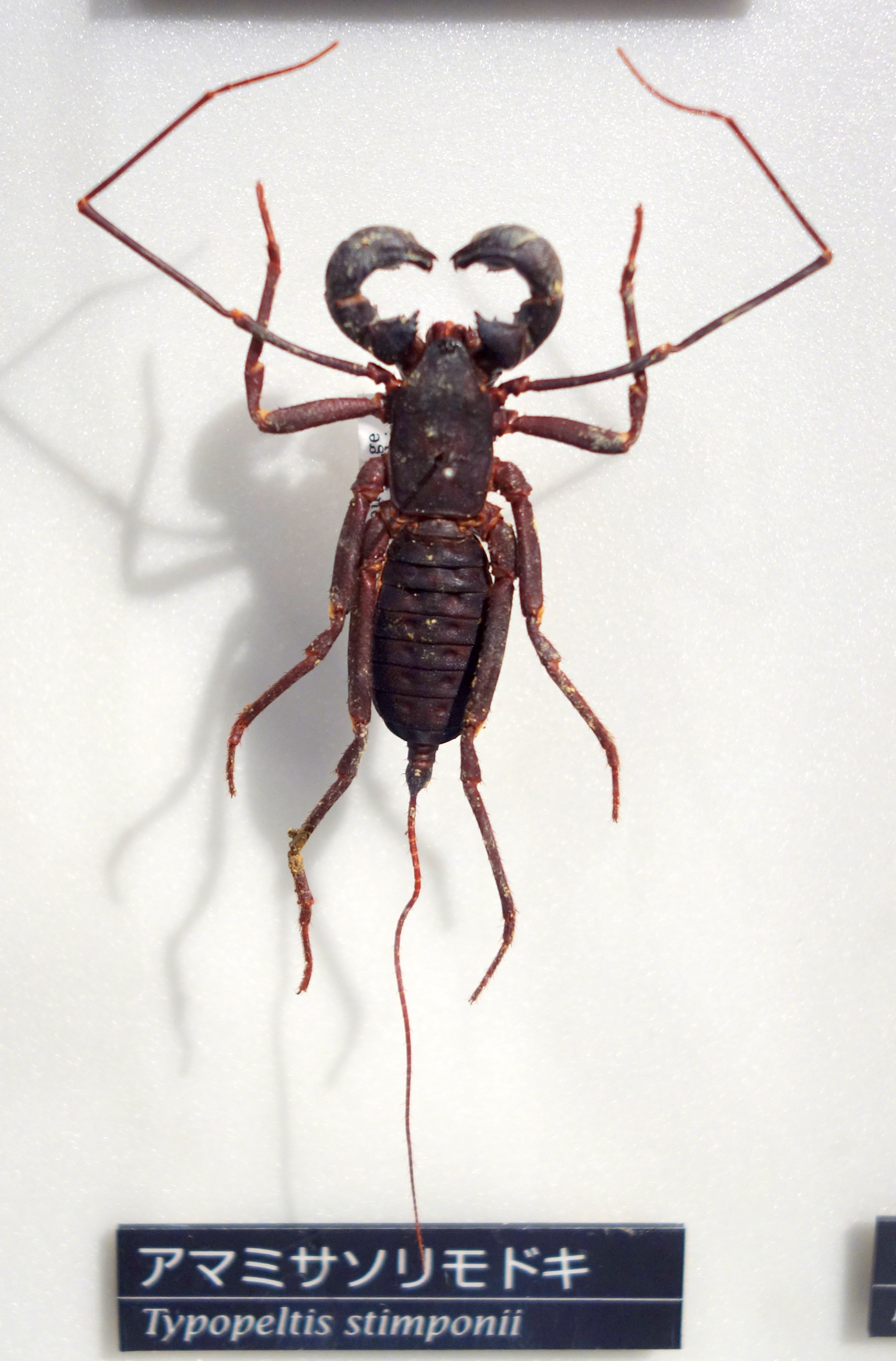
T. stimpsoni

== External Links & See Also ==
- List of Thelyphonidae species (includes fossil taxa)
- Media related to Typopeltis at Wikimedia Commons
