= Schizomus arganoi =

Scientific classification
- Kingdom: Animalia
- Phylum: Arthropoda
- Subphylum: Chelicerata
- Class: Arachnida
- Order: Schizomida
- Family: Hubbardiidae
- Genus: Schizomus
- Species: S. arganoi

Binomial name
- Schizomus arganoi Brignoli, 1973

Species of whipscorpion

Schizomus arganoi is a species of short-tailed whipscorpions of the Schizomus genus that belong to the Hubbardiidae family of Arachnids.
