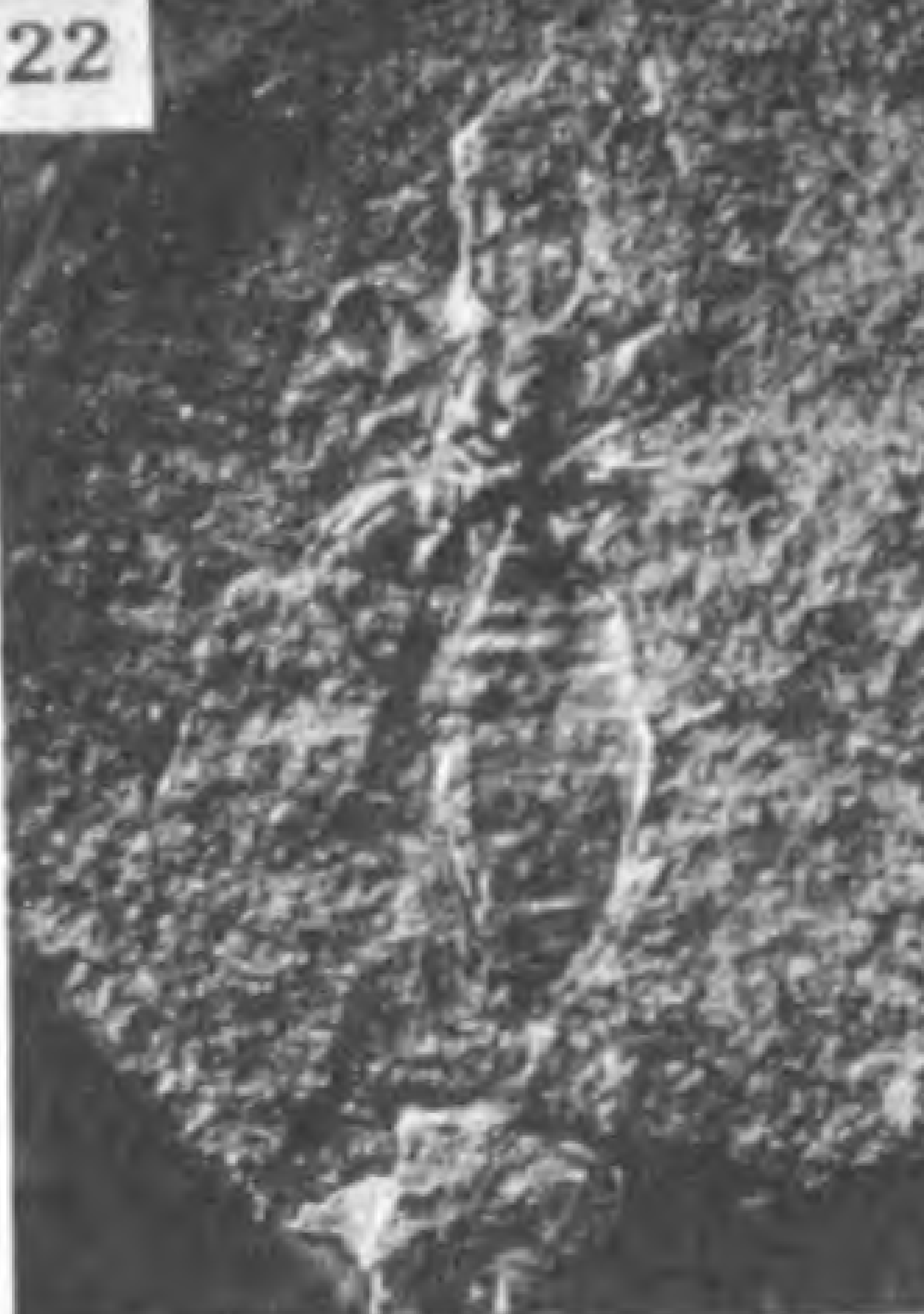
- Geralinura carbonaria Scudder, 1844

Scientific classification
- Kingdom: Animalia
- Phylum: Arthropoda
- Subphylum: Chelicerata
- Class: Arachnida
- Order: Uropygi
- Family: Thelyphonidae
- Genus: †Geralinura; Scudder, 1884

Type species
- Geralinura carbonaria Scudder, 1884

= Geralinura =

Geralinura Temporal range: Carboniferous

Extinct genus in the family Thelyphonidae

Geralinura is an extinct genus in the family Thelyphonidae, commonly known as whip scorpions. Fossil evidence found in the midwestern United States and the United Kingdom indicates that this genus lived during the mid-to-late Carboniferous period. Unlike the subchelate pedipalps of modern whip scorpions, the pedipalps of Geralinura are spiked and non-chelate, suggesting that the modern trait evolved at a later point in time.

== Species ==
The following is a list of all currently described species belonging to the genus Geralinura:

- Geralinura brittanica Pocock, 1911
- Geralinura carbonaria Scudder, 1884
- Geralinura crassa Kušta, 1888
- Geralinura noctua Kušta, 1888
- Geralinura scudderi Kušta, 1888
- Geralinura sutcliffei (Woodward, 1907)
