= Schizomus africanus =

Scientific classification
- Domain: Eukaryota
- Kingdom: Animalia
- Phylum: Arthropoda
- Subphylum: Chelicerata
- Class: Arachnida
- Order: Schizomida
- Family: Hubbardiidae
- Genus: Schizomus
- Species: S. africanus

Binomial name
- Schizomus africanus Hansen, 1905

Species of whipscorpion

Schizomus africanus is a species of short-tailed whipscorpions of the Schizomus genus that belong to the family Hubbardiidae of Arachnids.
