= Schizomus =

Scientific classification
- Domain: Eukaryota
- Kingdom: Animalia
- Phylum: Arthropoda
- Subphylum: Chelicerata
- Class: Arachnida
- Order: Schizomida
- Family: Hubbardiidae
- Genus: Schizomus; Cook, 1899

Type species
- Schizomus crassicaudatus (O. Pickard-Cambridge, 1872)

Species
- 24, see text

Genus of shorttailed whipscorpions

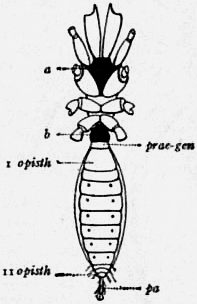

Schizomus is a genus of hubbardiid short-tailed whipscorpions, first described by Orator Cook in 1899.

== Species ==
As of June 2022, the World Schizomida Catalog accepts the following twenty-four species:

- Schizomus africanus (Hansen, 1905) – Sierra Leone
- Schizomus arganoi Brignoli, 1973 – Mexico
- Schizomus brevicaudus (Hansen, 1921) – Guinea-Bissau
- Schizomus cambridgei (Thorell, 1889) – Myanmar
- Schizomus crassicaudatus (O. Pickard-Cambridge, 1872) – Sri Lanka, Introduced to France
- Schizomus formicoides Fernando, 1957 – Sri Lanka
- Schizomus ghesquierei (Giltay, 1935) – Congo
- Schizomus greeni Gravely, 1912 – Sri Lanka
- Schizomus hanseni Mello-Leitão, 1931 – Tanzania
- Schizomus kharagpurensis Gravely, 1912 – India
- Schizomus mediocriter Lawrence, 1969 – Tanzania
- Schizomus modestus (Hansen, 1905) – Malaysia, Papua New Guinea
- Schizomus montanus Hansen, 1910 – Congo, Tanzania
- Schizomus nidicola Lawrence, 1969 – Congo
- Schizomus parvus (Hansen, 1921) – Cameroon, Equatorial Guinea, Gabon, São Tomé and Príncipe
- Schizomus pauliani Lawrence, 1969 – Comoros
- Schizomus perplexus Gravely, 1915 – Sri Lanka
- Schizomus peteloti (Rémy, 1946) – Vietnam
- Schizomus procerus (Hansen, 1905) – Singapore
- Schizomus schoutedeni (Roewer, 1954) – Congo
- Schizomus tenuipes Lawrence, 1969 – Mauritius (Rodrigues)
- Schizomus vinsoni Lawrence, 1969 – Mauritius
- Schizomus virescens Lawrence, 1969 – Mauritius (Rodrigues)
- Schizomus vittatus Gravely, 1911 – Sri Lanka
