= Schizomus vittatus =

Scientific classification
- Domain: Eukaryota
- Kingdom: Animalia
- Phylum: Arthropoda
- Subphylum: Chelicerata
- Class: Arachnida
- Order: Schizomida
- Family: Hubbardiidae
- Genus: Schizomus
- Species: S. vittatus

Binomial name
- Schizomus vittatus Gravely, 1911

Species of whipscorpion

Schizomus vittatus is a species of short-tailed whipscorpion in the family Hubbardiidae.
