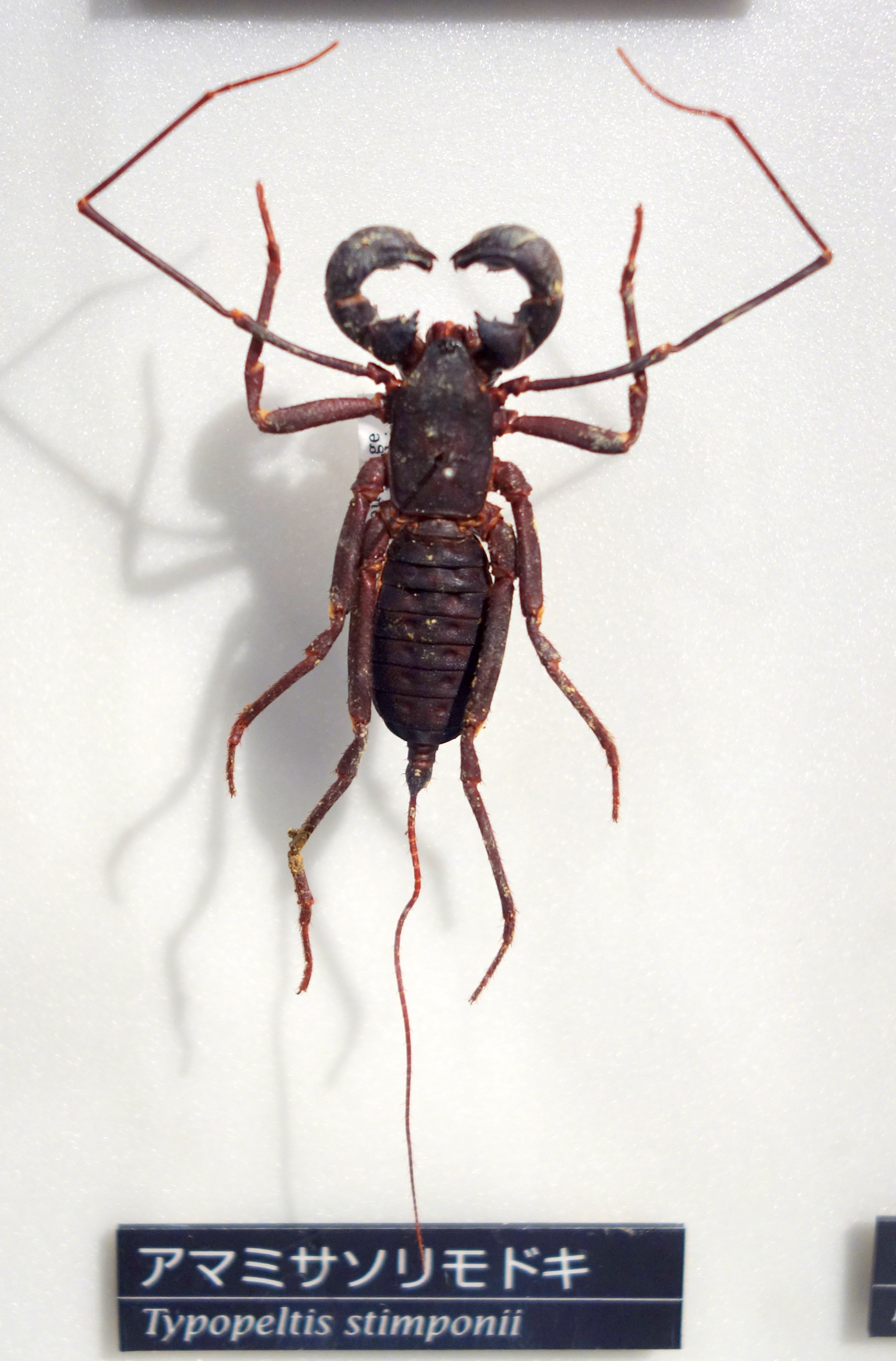

Scientific classification
- Domain: Eukaryota
- Kingdom: Animalia
- Phylum: Arthropoda
- Subphylum: Chelicerata
- Class: Arachnida
- Order: Uropygi
- Family: Thelyphonidae
- Genus: Typopeltis
- Species: T. stimpsonii

Binomial name
- Typopeltis stimpsonii (Wood, 1862)

Synonyms
- Thelyphonus formosus Wood, 1862

= Typopeltis stimpsonii =

Species of whip scorpion

Typopeltis stimpsonii is an arachnid species first described by Charles Thorold Wood in 1862. Typopeltis stimpsonii is part of the genus Typopeltis and the family Thelyphonidae. No subspecies are listed in the Catalog of Life.
