= Uroproctus =

Scientific classification
- Domain: Eukaryota
- Kingdom: Animalia
- Phylum: Arthropoda
- Subphylum: Chelicerata
- Class: Arachnida
- Order: Uropygi
- Family: Thelyphonidae
- Genus: Uroproctus; Pocock, 1894
- Species: U. assamensis

Binomial name
- Uroproctus assamensis (Stoliczka, 1869)

Genus of whip scorpions

Uroproctus is a monotypic genus of Thelyphonid whip scorpions, first described by Reginald Innes Pocock in 1894. Its single species, Uroproctus assamensis is distributed in Bangladesh, Bhutan, Cambodia, India and Nepal.
