= Thelyphonoides =

Scientific classification
- Domain: Eukaryota
- Kingdom: Animalia
- Phylum: Arthropoda
- Subphylum: Chelicerata
- Class: Arachnida
- Order: Uropygi
- Family: Thelyphonidae
- Genus: Thelyphonoides; Krehenwinkel, Curio, Tacud & Haupt, 2009
- Species: T. panayensis

Binomial name
- Thelyphonoides panayensis Krehenwinkel, Curio, Tacud & Haupt, 2009

Genus of whip scorpions

Thelyphonoides is a monotypic genus of Thelyphonid whip scorpions, first described by Krehenwinkel, Curio, Tacud and Haupt in 2009. Its single species, Thelyphonoides panayensis is distributed in Philippines.
