= Ginosigma =

Scientific classification
- Kingdom: Animalia
- Phylum: Arthropoda
- Subphylum: Chelicerata
- Class: Arachnida
- Order: Uropygi
- Family: Thelyphonidae
- Genus: Ginosigma; Speijer, 1936

Type species
- Ginosigma schimkewitschii (Tarnani, 1894)

Species
- 2, see text

Genus of whip scorpions

Ginosigma is a genus of Thelyphonid whip scorpions, first described by E. A. M. Speijer in 1936.

== Species ==
As of October 2022, the World Uropygi Catalog accepts the following two species:

- Ginosigma lombokensis Speijer, 1936 – Indonesia
- Ginosigma schimkewitschii (Tarnani, 1894) – Cambodia, Laos, Malaysia, Singapore, Thailand, Vietnam
