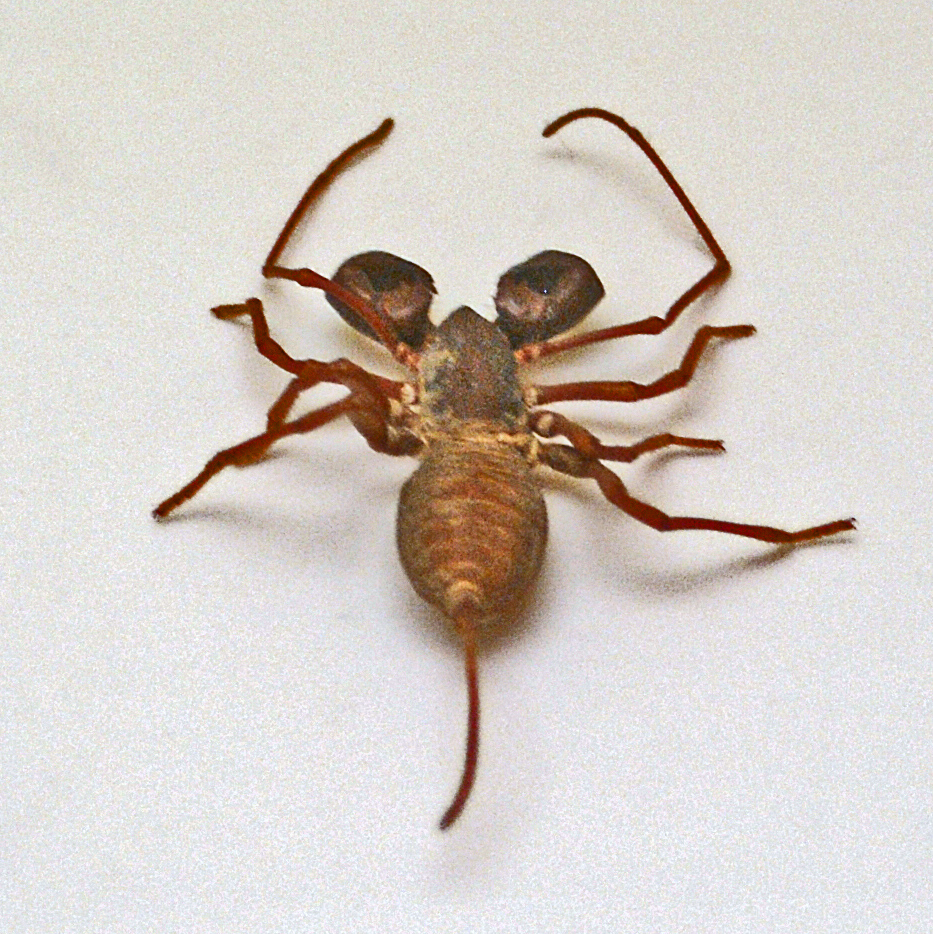
- Hypoctonus formosus from Myanmar

Scientific classification
- Domain: Eukaryota
- Kingdom: Animalia
- Phylum: Arthropoda
- Subphylum: Chelicerata
- Class: Arachnida
- Order: Uropygi
- Family: Thelyphonidae
- Subfamily: Hypoctoninae
- Genus: Hypoctonus; Thorell, 1888

Type species
- Hypoctonus formosus (Butler, 1872)

Species
- 19, see text

= Hypoctonus =

Genus of whip scorpions

Hypoctonus is a genus of Thelyphonid whip scorpions, first described by Tamerlan Thorell in 1888.

== Species ==
As of October 2022, the World Uropygi Catalog accepts the following nineteen species:

- Hypoctonus andersoni (Oates, 1889) – Myanmar
- Hypoctonus binghami (Oates, 1889) – Myanmar
- Hypoctonus birmanicus Hirst, 1911 – Myanmar
- Hypoctonus browni Gravely, 1912 – Myanmar
- Hypoctonus carmichaeli Gravely, 1916 – Bangladesh
- Hypoctonus dawnae Gravely, 1912 – Myanmar
- Hypoctonus ellisi Gravely, 1912 – Myanmar
- Hypoctonus formosus (Butler, 1872) – Myanmar
- Hypoctonus gastrostictus Kraepelin, 1897 – Borneo
- Hypoctonus granosus Pocock, 1900 – China
- Hypoctonus javanicus Speijer, 1933 – Indonesia
- Hypoctonus kraepelini Simon, 1901 – Thailand
- Hypoctonus oatesii Pocock, 1900 – Bangladesh, Bhutan
- Hypoctonus rangunensis (Oates, 1889) – Myanmar
- Hypoctonus saxatilis (Oates, 1889) – Myanmar
- Hypoctonus siamensis Haupt, 1996 – Thailand
- Hypoctonus stoliczkae Gravely, 1912 – India
- Hypoctonus sylvaticus (Oates, 1889) – Myanmar
- Hypoctonus woodmasoni (Oates, 1889) – Myanmar
