= Ravilops =

Scientific classification
- Domain: Eukaryota
- Kingdom: Animalia
- Phylum: Arthropoda
- Subphylum: Chelicerata
- Class: Arachnida
- Order: Uropygi
- Family: Thelyphonidae
- Genus: Ravilops; Víquez & Armas, 2005

Type species
- Ravilops wetherbeei (Armas, 2002)

Species
- 2, see text

Genus of whip scorpions

Ravilops is a genus of thelyphonid whip scorpions, first described by Víquez and Armas in 2005. Both species are endemic to the Dominican Republic, on the Caribbean island of Hispaniola.

== Species ==
As of October 2022, the World Uropygi Catalog accepts the following two species:

- Ravilops kovariki Teruel, 2017 – Dominican Republic
- Ravilops wetherbeei (Armas, 2002) – Dominican Republic
