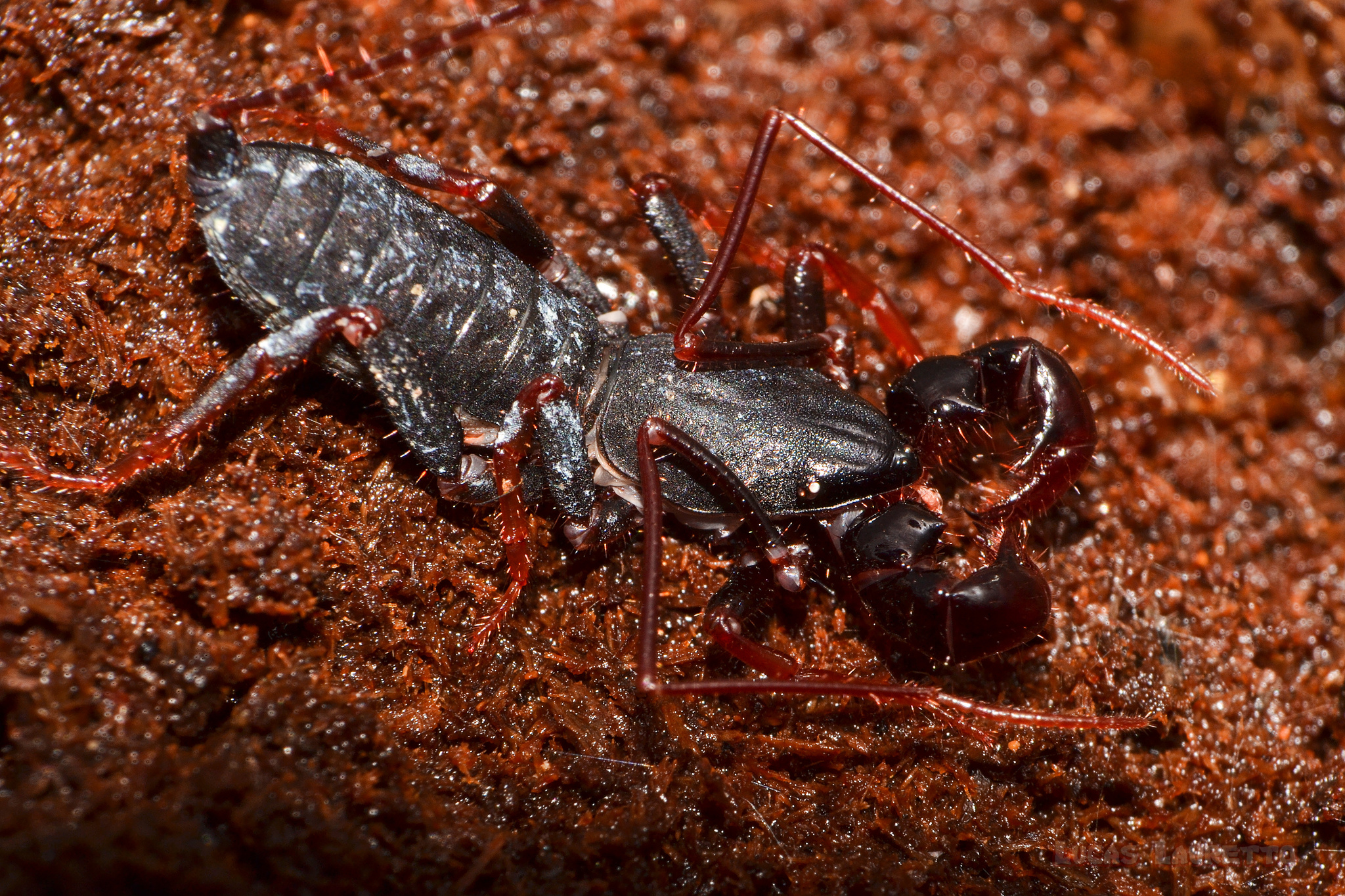
- Thelyphonellus amazonicus

Scientific classification
- Domain: Eukaryota
- Kingdom: Animalia
- Phylum: Arthropoda
- Subphylum: Chelicerata
- Class: Arachnida
- Order: Uropygi
- Family: Thelyphonidae
- Genus: Thelyphonellus; Pocock, 1894

Type species
- Thelyphonellus amazonicus (Butler, 1872)

Species
- 4, see text

= Thelyphonellus =

Genus of whip scorpions

Thelyphonellus is a genus of Thelyphonid whip scorpions, first described by Reginald Innes Pocock in 1894.

== Species ==
As of October 2022, the World Uropygi Catalog accepts the following four species:

- Thelyphonellus amazonicus (Butler, 1872) – Brazil, Suriname
- Thelyphonellus ruschii Weygoldt, 1979 – Guyana
- Thelyphonellus vanegasae Giupponi & Vasconcelos, 2008 – Colombia
- Thelyphonellus venezolanus Haupt, 2009 – Venezuela
