= Glyptogluteus =

Scientific classification
- Domain: Eukaryota
- Kingdom: Animalia
- Phylum: Arthropoda
- Subphylum: Chelicerata
- Class: Arachnida
- Order: Uropygi
- Family: Thelyphonidae
- Genus: Glyptogluteus; Rowland, 1973
- Species: G. augustus

Binomial name
- Glyptogluteus augustus Rowland, 1973

Genus of whip scorpions

Glyptogluteus is a monotypic genus of Thelyphonid whip scorpions, first described by Jon Mark Rowland in 1973. Its single species, Glyptogluteus augustus is distributed in Philippines.
