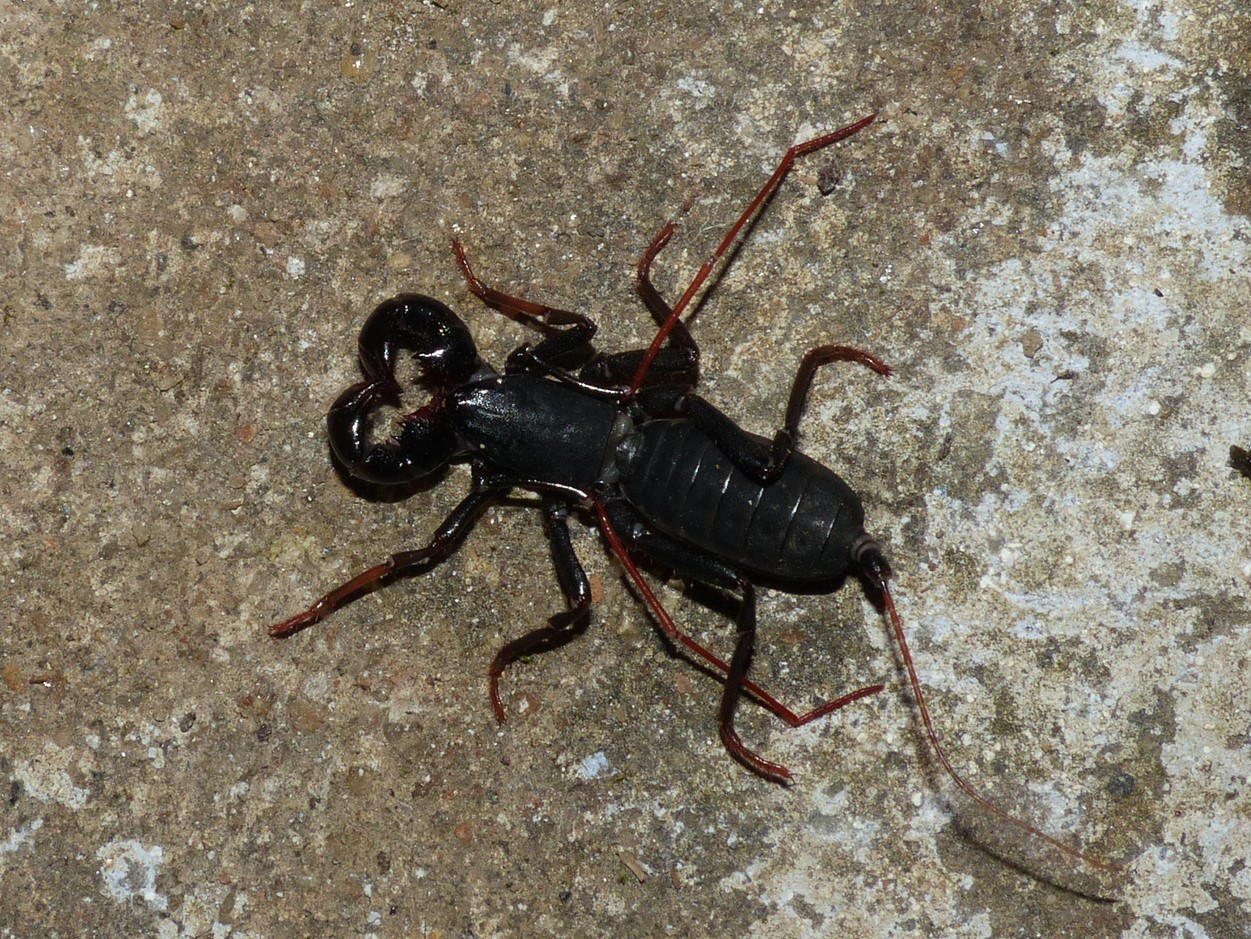
- Labochirus tauricornis

Scientific classification
- Domain: Eukaryota
- Kingdom: Animalia
- Phylum: Arthropoda
- Subphylum: Chelicerata
- Class: Arachnida
- Order: Uropygi
- Family: Thelyphonidae
- Genus: Labochirus; Pocock, 1894

Type species
- Labochirus proboscideus (Butler, 1872)

Species
- 3, see text

= Labochirus =

Genus of whip scorpions

Labochirus is a genus of Thelyphonid whip scorpions, first described by Reginald Innes Pocock in 1894.

== Species ==
As of October 2022, the World Uropygi Catalog accepts the following three species:

- Labochirus cervinus Pocock, 1899 – India
- Labochirus proboscideus (Butler, 1872) – Sri Lanka
- Labochirus tauricornis Pocock, 1900 – India
