= Peña Blanca, Guatemala =

Village in Chiquimula, Guatemala

Peña Blanca is a small village in the municipality of Camotan, Chiquimula, Guatemala. It is located at 14°54′0″N 89°18′0″W.
