= Etienneus =

Scientific classification
- Domain: Eukaryota
- Kingdom: Animalia
- Phylum: Arthropoda
- Subphylum: Chelicerata
- Class: Arachnida
- Order: Uropygi
- Family: Thelyphonidae
- Genus: Etienneus; Heurtault, 1984
- Species: E. africanus

Binomial name
- Etienneus africanus (Hentschel, 1899)

Genus of whip scorpions

Etienneus is a monotypic genus of Thelyphonid whip scorpions, first described by Jacqueline Heurtault in 1984. Its single species, Etienneus africanus is distributed in West Africa. It is the only uropygid found in Africa.
