= Valeriophonus =

Scientific classification
- Domain: Eukaryota
- Kingdom: Animalia
- Phylum: Arthropoda
- Subphylum: Chelicerata
- Class: Arachnida
- Order: Uropygi
- Family: Thelyphonidae
- Genus: Valeriophonus; Víquez & Armas, 2005
- Species: V. nara

Binomial name
- Valeriophonus nara (Valerio, 1981)

Genus of whip scorpions

Valeriophonus is a monotypic genus of Thelyphonid whip scorpions, first described by Víquez and Armas in 2005. Its single species, Valeriophonus nara is distributed in Costa Rica.
