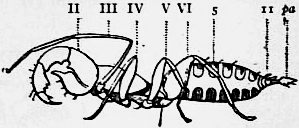

Scientific classification
- Kingdom: Animalia
- Phylum: Arthropoda
- Subphylum: Chelicerata
- Class: Arachnida
- Order: Schizomida
- Family: Hubbardiidae
- Genus: Schizomus
- Species: S. crassicaudatus

Binomial name
- Schizomus crassicaudatus O. Pickard-Cambridge, 1872

= Schizomus crassicaudatus =

Species of whipscorpion

Schizomus crassicaudatus is a species of short-tailed whipscorpions of the Schizomus genus that belong to the Hubbardiidae family of Arachnids.
