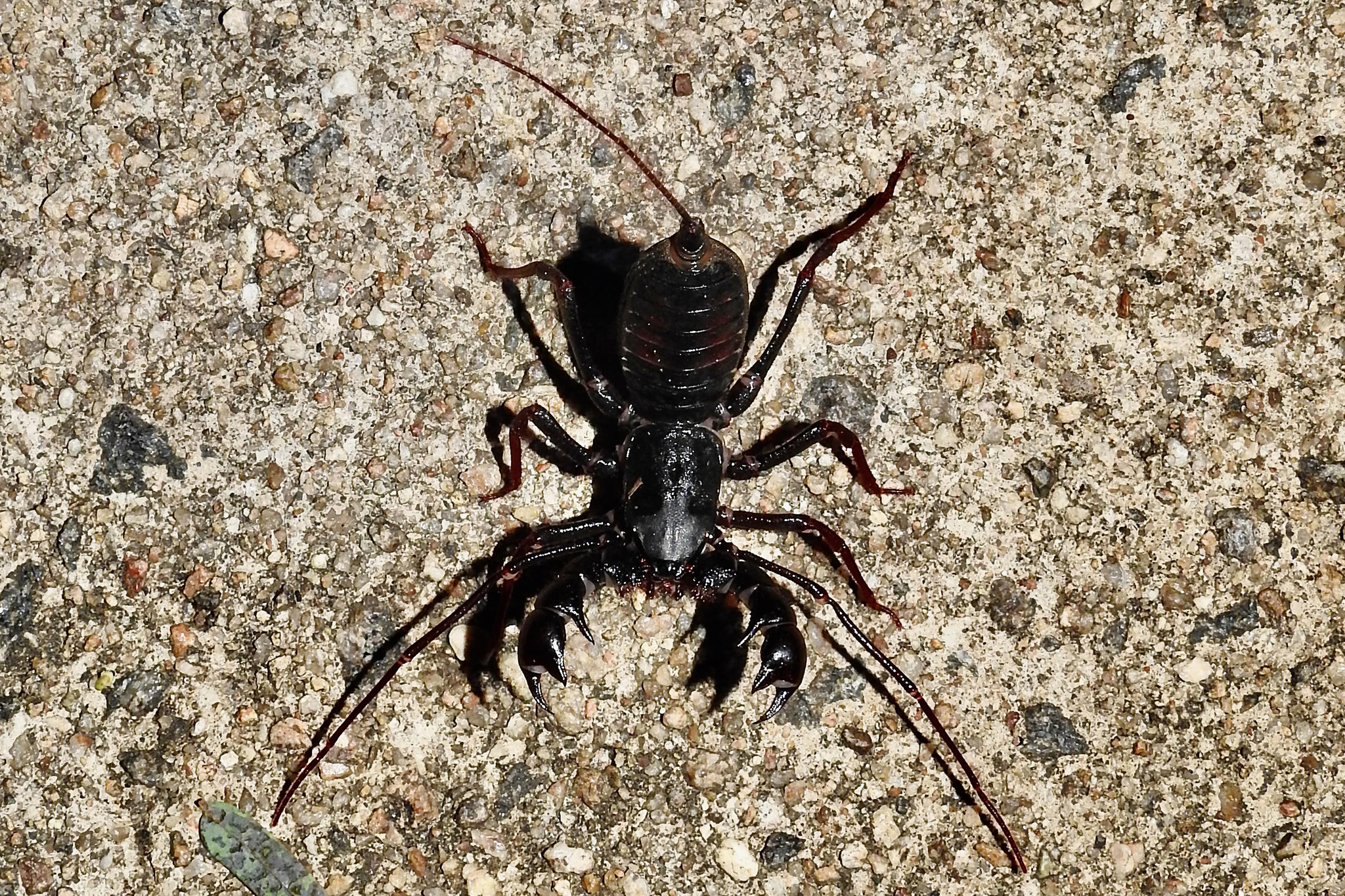
- From Vellore, Tamil Nadu, India.

Scientific classification
- Domain: Eukaryota
- Kingdom: Animalia
- Phylum: Arthropoda
- Subphylum: Chelicerata
- Class: Arachnida
- Order: Uropygi
- Family: Thelyphonidae
- Genus: Thelyphonus
- Species: T. sepiaris

Binomial name
- Thelyphonus sepiaris (Butler, 1873)

= Thelyphonus sepiaris =

Species of whip scorpion

Thelyphonus sepiaris is a species of whip scorpion or vinegaroons found in India and Sri Lanka.

== Description ==
Thelyphonus sepiaris specimens exhibit a black or blackish-brown deep coloration with reddish brown coloration with reddish brown undersides. It features distinct ocular ridges along its carapace margin and exhibits specific anatomical characteristics on its pedipalp, including teeth on the trochanter and femur. Notably, the first abdominal sternum has a pronounced posterior border. T. sepiaris has tibial spines on its second, third, and fourth leg pairs and a telson with 27 hairy segments.

== Range ==
Thelyphonus sepiaris has been reported in Sri Lanka, (Jaffna and Trincomalee). In India, It is endemic to the Deccan in Oriental Region. It has been found in northern and inland in to the Eastern Ghats, and Godavari River Basin in Andhra Pradesh, again in Deccan plateau. It has also been in found in Central India and Karnataka.

== Habitat and ecology ==
Specimens of Thelyphonus sepiaris were found under either decaying logs or stones near humid places full of leaf litter near perennial water source. Generally it is found under the medium size stones near humid places with full of leaf litter. Specimens collected from Andhra Pradesh and Karnataka were from typical southern tropical dry deciduous forest types intermingled with scrub.
