= Mayacentrum =

Scientific classification
- Domain: Eukaryota
- Kingdom: Animalia
- Phylum: Arthropoda
- Subphylum: Chelicerata
- Class: Arachnida
- Order: Uropygi
- Family: Thelyphonidae
- Genus: Mayacentrum; Víquez & Armas, 2006

Type species
- Mayacentrum tantalus (Roewer, 1954)

Species
- 3, see text

Genus of whip scorpions

Mayacentrum is a genus of Thelyphonid whip scorpions, first described by Víquez and Armas in 2006.

== Species ==
As of October 2022, the World Uropygi Catalog accepts the following three species:

- Mayacentrum guatemalae Víquez & Armas, 2006 – Belize, Guatemala
- Mayacentrum pijol Víquez & Armas, 2006 – Guatemala, Honduras
- Mayacentrum tantalus (Roewer, 1954) – El Salvador, Guatemala
