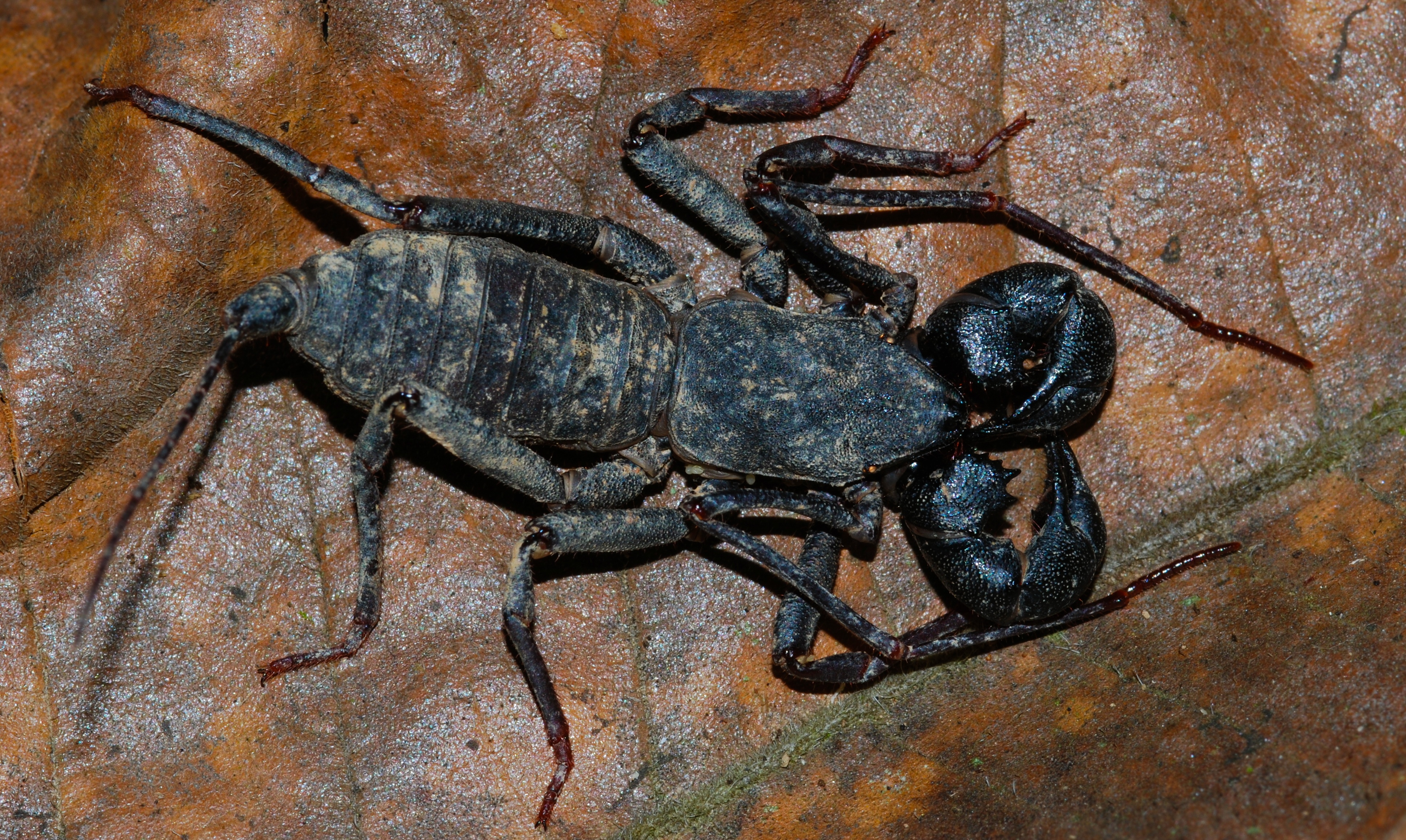
- Thelyphonus sp. (Malaysia)

Scientific classification
- Kingdom: Animalia
- Phylum: Arthropoda
- Subphylum: Chelicerata
- Class: Arachnida
- Order: Uropygi
- Family: Thelyphonidae
- Subfamily: Thelyphoninae
- Genus: Thelyphonus; Latreille, 1802

Type species
- Thelyphonus caudatus (Linnaeus, 1758)

Species
- 45, see text

= Thelyphonus =

Genus of whip scorpions

Thelyphonus is the type genus of whip scorpions or 'vinegaroons' in the subfamily Thelyphoninae, with species found in Southeast Asia.

== Species ==
As of October 2022, the World Uropygi Catalog accepts the following forty-five species:

- Thelyphonus ambonensis (Speijer, 1933) – Indonesia
- Thelyphonus angustus Lucas, 1835 – unknown
- Thelyphonus anthracinus Pocock, 1894 – Malaysia
- Thelyphonus asperatus Thorell, 1888 – Indonesia
- Thelyphonus billitonensis Speijer, 1931 – Indonesia
- Thelyphonus borneensis Kraepelin, 1897 – Borneo
- Thelyphonus borneonus Haupt, 2009 – Borneo
- Thelyphonus burchardi Kraepelin, 1911 – Indonesia
- Thelyphonus caudatus (Linnaeus, 1758) – Vietnam, Indonesia
- Thelyphonus celebensis Kraepelin, 1897 – Indonesia
- Thelyphonus dammermanni (Speijer, 1933) – Indonesia
- Thelyphonus dicranotarsalis (Rowland, 1973) – Papua New Guinea
- Thelyphonus doriae Thorell, 1888 – Malaysia
- Thelyphonus feuerborni Werner, 1932 – Java
- Thelyphonus florensis (Speijer, 1933) – Indonesia
- Thelyphonus gertschi (Rowland, 1973) – Papua New Guinea
- Thelyphonus grandis Speijer, 1931 – Borneo
- Thelyphonus hansenii Kraeplein, 1897 – Philippines
- Thelyphonus insulanus L.Koch & Keyserling, 1885 – Fiji
- Thelyphonus kinabaluensis Speijer, 1933 – Malaysia
- Thelyphonus klugii Kraepelin, 1897 – Indonesia
- Thelyphonus kopsteini (Speijer, 1933) – Indonesia
- Thelyphonus kraepelini Speijer, 1931 – Indonesia
- Thelyphonus lawrencei Rowland, 1973 – Solomon Islands
- Thelyphonus leucurus Pocock, 1898 – Solomons
- Thelyphonus linganus C.L.Koch, 1843 – Indonesia, Malaysia
- Thelyphonus lucanoides Butler, 1872 – Indonesia, Sarawak
- Thelyphonus luzonicus Haupt, 2009 – Philippines
- Thelyphonus manilanus C.L. Koch, 1843 – Indonesia, Papua New Guinea, Philippines, Thailand
- Thelyphonus nasutus (Thorell, 1888) – Borneo
- Thelyphonus pococki Tarnani, 1900 – Indonesia
- Thelyphonus renschi (Speijer, 1936) – Borneo
- Thelyphonus rohdei (Kraepelin, 1897) – Indonesia, Papua New Guinea
- Thelyphonus samoanus (Kraepelin, 1897) – Samoa
- Thelyphonus schnehagenii Kraepelin, 1897 – Burma
- Thelyphonus semperi Kraepelin, 1897 – Philippines
- Thelyphonus sepiaris Butler, 1873 – India, Sri Lanka
- Thelyphonus seticauda Doleschall, 1857 – Indonesia, Philippines
- Thelyphonus spinimanus Lucas, 1835 – unknown
- Thelyphonus suckii Kraepelin, 1897 – Indonesia
- Thelyphonus sumatranus Kraepelin, 1897 – Indonesia
- Thelyphonus tarnanii Pocock, 1894 – Sumatra
- Thelyphonus vanoorti Speijer, 1936 – Philippines
- Thelyphonus wayi Pocock, 1900 – Cambodia
- Thelyphonus willeyi (Pocock, 1898) – Papua New Guinea

== External Links & See Also ==
- List of Thelyphonidae species (includes fossil taxa)
- Media related to Thelyphonus at Wikimedia Commons
