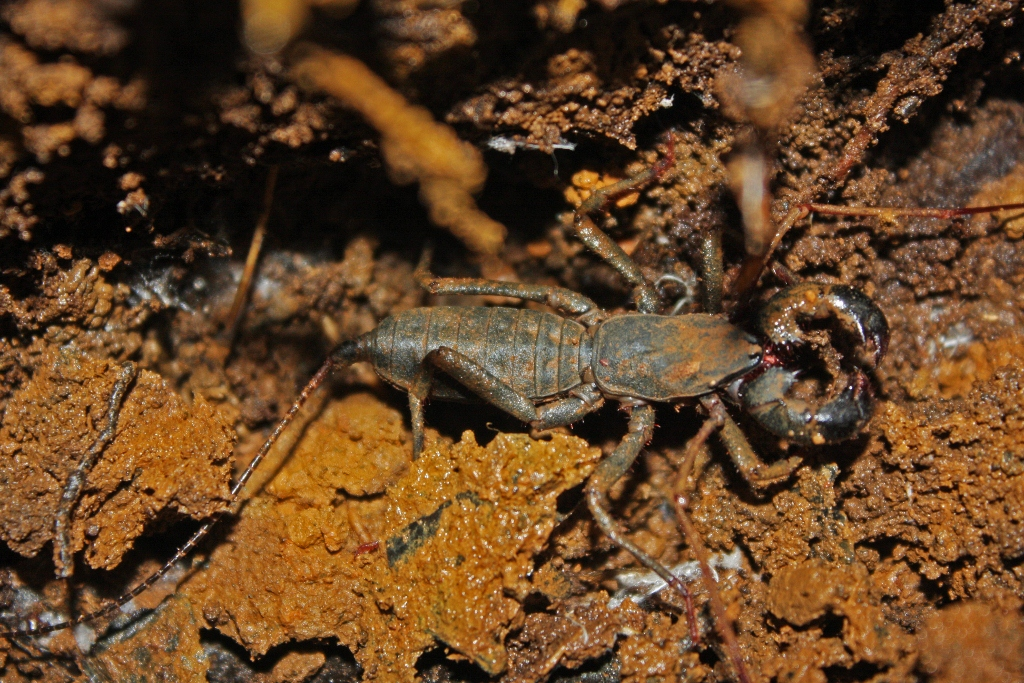
- Mastigoproctus baracoensis

Scientific classification
- Kingdom: Animalia
- Phylum: Arthropoda
- Subphylum: Chelicerata
- Class: Arachnida
- Clade: Thelyphonida
- Order: Uropygi
- Family: Thelyphonidae
- Subfamily: Mastigoproctinae
- Genus: Mastigoproctus; Pocock, 1894

Type species
- Mastigoproctus giganteus (Lucas, 1835)

Species
- Around 30 spp., see text

= Mastigoproctus =

Genus of whip scorpions

Mastigoproctus is a genus of whip scorpions, also called giant whip scorpion, giant vinegaroon, or grampus. Around 30 species have been described. Despite some popular beliefs, they are not dangerous to humans as are not venomous as they do not possess venom glands.

== Ecology ==
They are efficient predators that usually feed at night on a variety of arthropods, especially small insects such as cockroaches and crickets, as well as millipedes, worms, slugs and other arachnids. They have even been recorded feeding on small frogs and toads. They use their large pedipalps to hold prey, while the mechanical action of their chelicerae tear and bite the prey.

== Economic impact ==
Mastigoproctus are regarded as beneficial to agriculture and human residences by controlling populations of stinging scorpion, insects, or spiders.

== Habitat ==
Several species of Mastigoproctus occur across Mexico, where habitats vary from pasturelands to pine/oak forest, at sites with altitudes ranging from near sea level to 2440 m above sea level.

In the southern USA, the recently described Mastigoproctus tohono Barrales-Alcalá, Francke & Prendini, 2018 is found in Arizona. This was distinguished from the Central Mexican Mastigoproctus giganteus (Lucas, 1835) with which it has been historically confused. Elsewhere in the southern USA, Mastigoproctus can also be found in New Mexico, and Western Texas. A geographically isolated species Mastigoproctus floridanus Lönnberg, 1897 occurs in Florida

A few other species are known only from the Caribbean, from Cuba or Hispaniola (Dominican Republic and Haiti). A few other species have been recorded in historical studies from South America, although most of the latter have never been restudied since first described.

== Species ==
As of October 2023, the World Uropygi Catalog accepts the following twenty-five species:

- Mastigoproctus abeli Villarreal & Giupponi, 2009 – Venezuela
- Mastigoproctus annectens Werner, 1916 – Brazil
- Mastigoproctus ayalai Viquez & Armas, 2007 – Venezuela
- Mastigoproctus baracoensis Franganillo, 1931 – Cuba
- Mastigoproctus brasilianus (C. L. Koch, 1843) – Brazil
- Mastigoproctus butleri Pocock, 1894 – Brazil
- Mastigoproctus cinteotl Barrales-Alcalá, Francke & Prendini, 2018 – Mexico
- Mastigoproctus claritae Torres-Muñoz, Lira & González-Santillán 2026 – Mexico
- Mastigoproctus colombianus Mello-Leitão, 1940 – Colombia
- Mastigoproctus floridanus Lönnberg, 1897 – USA (Florida)
- Mastigoproctus formidabilis Hirst, 1912 – Venezuela
- Mastigoproctus franckei Barrales-Alcalá & Francke, 2023 – Mexico
- Mastigoproctus giganteus (Lucas, 1835) – Mexico (only historical records from United States)
- Mastigoproctus lacandonensis Ballesteros & Francke, 2006 – Mexico
- Mastigoproctus maximus (Tarnani, 1889) – Brazil
- Mastigoproctus mexicanus (Butler, 1872) – Mexico
- Mastigoproctus minensis Mello-Leitão, 1931 – Brazil
- Mastigoproctus perditus Mello-Leitão, 1931 – Brazil
- Mastigoproctus proscorpio (Latreille, 1806) – Hispaniola (Dominican Republic, Haiti), [Martinique?]
- Mastigoproctus santiago Teruel, 2010 – Cuba
- Mastigoproctus scabrosus Pocock, 1902 – Mexico
- Mastigoproctus spinifemoratus Castro-Pereira, Pinto-da-Rocha & Prendini 2025 – Mexico
- Mastigoproctus tohono Barrales-Alcalá, Francke & Prendini, 2018 – Mexico
- Mastigoproctus vandevenderi Barrales-Alcalá, Francke & Prendini, 2018 – Mexico
- Mastigoproctus xetame Barrales-Alcalá & Francke, 2023 – Mexico
- Mastigoproctus yalchanchak Barrales-Alcalá & Francke, 2023 – Mexico

Of these, several Mexican and USA species have historically been confused with Mastigoproctus giganteus (Localities adapted from Castro-Pereira et al. 2025 [Table 1], and Torres-Muñoz et al. 2026 [Table 2]:

USA & Northern Mexico:

- Mastigoproctus floridanus Lönnberg, 1897 – USA (Florida)
- [?] "Mastigoproctus" excubitor Girard, 1853 – USA (Louisiana?) [Usually treated as synonym]
- Mastigoproctus tohono Barrales-Alcalá, Francke & Prendini, 2018 – Mexico (Sonora), USA (Arizona)
- Mastigoproctus vandevenderi Barrales-Alcalá, Francke & Prendini, 2018 – Mexico (Sonora)

(North)western Mexico:

- Mastigoproctus mexicanus (Butler, 1872) – Mexico (Aguascalientes, Jalisco [north], possibly Durango [?], Nayarit [?])
- Mastigoproctus xetame Barrales-Alcalá & Francke, 2023 – Mexico (Jalisco [inland])
- Mastigoproctus claritae Torres-Muñoz, Lira & González-Santillán 2026 – Mexico (Jalisco [coastal])

(North)eastern Mexico:

- Mastigoproctus spinifemoratus Castro-Pereira, Pinto-da-Rocha & Prendini 2025 – Mexico (Nuevo León, Tamaulipas)
- Mastigoproctus cinteotl Barrales-Alcalá, Francke & Prendini, 2018 – Mexico (Querétaro, San Luis Potosí, Tamaulipas)
- Mastigoproctus franckei Barrales-Alcalá & Francke, 2023 – Mexico (San Luis Potosí)

Central or Eastern Gulf Mexico:

- Mastigoproctus scabrosus Pocock, 1902 – Mexico (Oaxaca, Veracruz, plausibly Chiapas)
- Mastigoproctus giganteus (Lucas, 1835) – Mexico (Morelos) [Contra historical records from US]

Southern Mexico:

- Mastigoproctus yalchanchak Barrales-Alcalá & Francke, 2023 – Mexico (Chiapas)
- Mastigoproctus lacandonensis Ballesteros & Francke, 2006 – Mexico (Chiapas)

Else also see

- Mastigoproctus transoceanicus Lazell, 2000 (Junior subjective synonym of Typopeltis cantonensis)
