= Mastigoproctus giganteus =

Scientific classification
- Kingdom: Animalia
- Phylum: Arthropoda
- Subphylum: Chelicerata
- Class: Arachnida
- Order: Uropygi
- Family: Thelyphonidae
- Subfamily: Mastigoproctinae
- Genus: Mastigoproctus
- Species: M. giganteus

Binomial name
- Mastigoproctus giganteus (Lucas, 1835)

Synonyms
- Thelyphonus giganteus

Species of whip scorpion

Mastigoproctus giganteus, the giant whip scorpion, also called the giant vinegaroon, grampus, or Texas giant vinegaroon, is a species of whip scorpions in the family Thelyphonidae. Its native range is from the Southern United States to Mexico.

== Description ==
This species can grow to be 40–60 millimetres (1.6–2.4 in) long, excluding the tail. They have six legs used for movement, two long antenniform front legs that they use to feel around for prey and detect vibrations, and two large pedipalps modified into claws that they use to crush their prey. They have a long, thin, whip-like tail, the origin of the common name whipscorpion. From the base of this tail they can spray a substance composed of 85% acetic acid in order to defend themselves. Acetic acid is the main component of vinegar, so the spray smells strongly of vinegar, leading to the common name "vinegaroon".

Mastigoproctus giganteus have eight eyes: two in a pair on the front of the head and three on each side of the head. These eyes are very weak, so Mastigoproctus giganteus navigates mostly by feeling with its long front legs, tail, and pedipalps.

== Habitat ==
Mastigoproctus giganteus lives in the southern US and in Mexico at elevations between 1380–1800m. It preys on various insects, worms, and slugs. It is an efficient predator that feeds at night on a variety of arthropods, primarily insects such as cockroaches and crickets, as well as millipedes and other arachnids. It has even been recorded feeding on small frogs and toads. It uses its large pedipalps to hold prey, while the chelicerae tear and bite the prey.

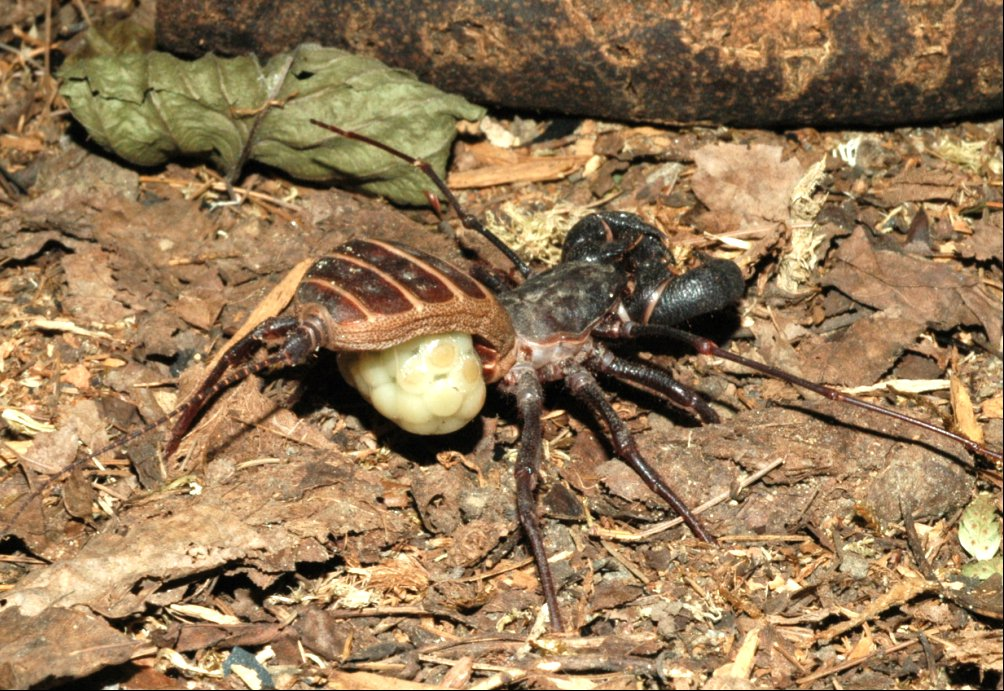
Mastigoproctus giganteus female with egg sac

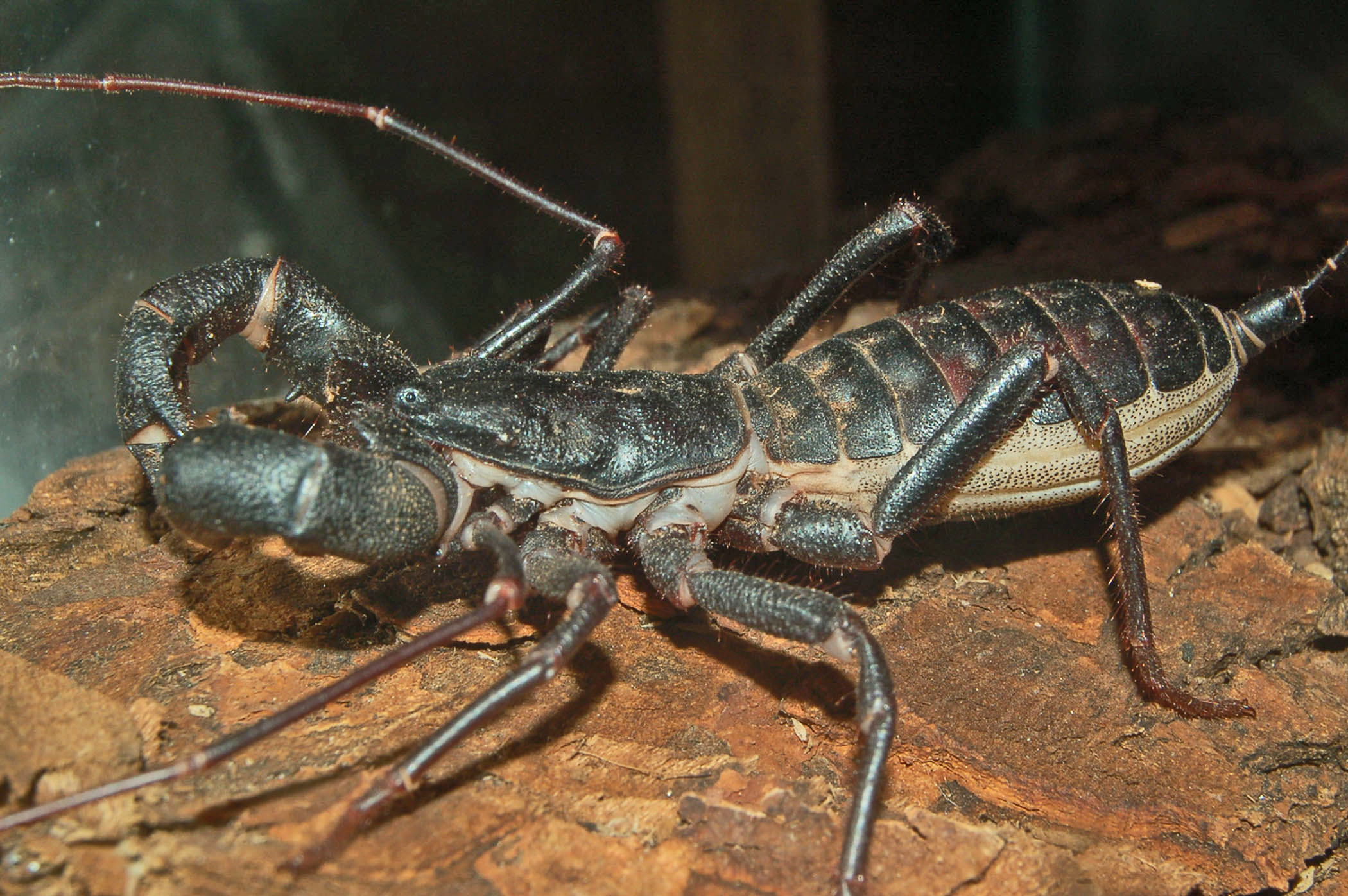
Pet male whip scorpion

Mastigoproctus giganteus is the only species of family Thelyphonidae that occurs in the United States, where it is found in Arizona, Florida, New Mexico, Oklahoma, and Texas.

Vinegaroons are efficient predators of scorpions and are sometimes acquired for that purpose. M. giganteus in turn may be eaten by raccoons, coatis, armadillos, skunks, bears, hogs and peccaries, and ground birds such as roadrunners, lizards, and tarantulas.

== Life cycle and reproduction ==
Mastigoproctus giganteus typically lives 4 to 7 years, but the female reproduces only once, producing about 40 offspring which she protects and feeds in their early lives.

Males fight each other at night in fierce battles for the privilege of mating with a female, also at night.

Survivability of young is improved by continual care by the mother.

== Economic impact ==
Mastigoproctus giganteus is regarded as beneficial to agriculture and human residences by controlling stinging scorpions, insects, and spider populations.

== As pets ==
This species is sold in the exotic animal trade as pets.

Non-venomous, they can be kept as individual adults or groups of juveniles in terrariums with places to dig and hide. They can be fed insects twice a week, especially crickets, cockroaches and flies. Mastigoproctus giganteus should be handled gently, with care given to avoid injuring the arachnid. While they seldom bite or pinch humans, the acid sprayed from the base of a vinegaroon's tail can sting if it enters mucous membranes or cuts, and can cause eye irritation.

== Subspecies ==
- Mastigoproctus giganteus giganteus (Lucas, 1835) — Southern USA
- Mastigoproctus giganteus excubitor (Girard, 1854) — University Of Florida
- Mastigoproctus giganteus rufus mexicanus (Butler, 1872) — Mexico
- Mastigoproctus giganteus giganteus (Lonnberg, 1879) — Florida to Arizona
- Mastigoproctus giganteus scabrosus (Pocock, 1902) — Mexico
- Four subspecies A, B, C, and D are under study in The American Museum of Natural History, New York City and The National Autonomous University of Mexico.
