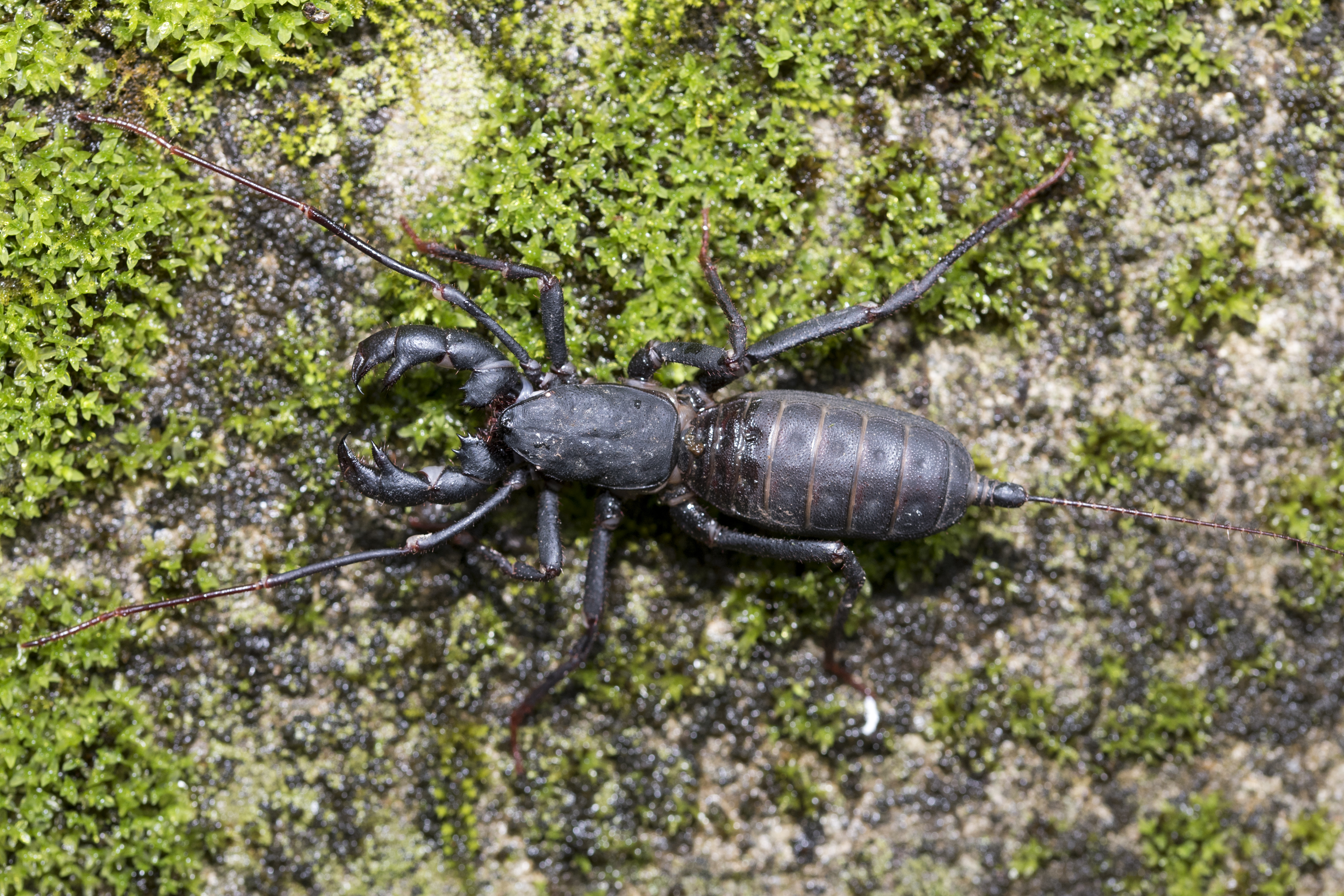
- Typopeltis crucifer

Scientific classification
- Kingdom: Animalia
- Phylum: Arthropoda
- Subphylum: Chelicerata
- Class: Arachnida
- Clade: Thelyphonida
- Order: Uropygi; Thorell, 1883

Families and genera
- See text

Diversity
- c. 27 genera, over 100 species

Synonyms
- Thelyphonida Latreille, 1804 (as Thélyphone)

= Uropygi =

Whip scorpions, vinegaroons Temporal range: Carboniferous–present

Order of arachnids known as whip scorpions

Uropygi is an arachnid order comprising invertebrates commonly known as whip scorpions or vinegaroons (also spelled vinegarroons and vinegarones). They are often called uropygids. The name "whip scorpion" refers to their resemblance to true scorpions and possession of a whiplike tail, and "vinegaroon" refers to their ability when attacked to discharge an offensive, vinegar-smelling liquid, which contains acetic acid. All living members of Uropygi are classified within the family Thelyphonidae. The order may also be called Thelyphonida. Both names, Uropygi and Thelyphonida, may be used either in a narrow sense for the order of whip scorpions, or in a broad sense which includes the order Schizomida. (Note: For clarity, sensu stricto or s.s. may be added to specify the narrow sense, and sensu lato or s.l. added to specify the broad sense. When these additions are omitted, the names Uropygi and Thelyphonida are ambiguous.)

== Taxonomy ==
Carl Linnaeus first described a whip scorpion in 1758, although he did not distinguish it from what are now regarded as different kinds of arachnid, calling it Phalangium caudatum. Phalangium is now used as a name for a genus of harvestmen (Opiliones). In 1802, Pierre André Latreille was the first to use a genus name solely for whip scorpions, namely Thelyphonus. Latreille later explained the name as meaning "qui tue", meaning "who kills". (Note: In Greek φόνος, phonos, means "murder", while φονός, with final accent, can be an adjective meaning "murderous", but also a noun meaning "murderess"; Latreille did not account for the element θῆλυς, thelys, meaning "female".) One name for the order, Thelyphonida, is based on Latreille's genus name. It was first used, as the French Thélyphone, by Latreille in 1804, and later by Octavius Pickard-Cambridge in 1872 (with the spelling Thelyphonidea).

The alternative name, Uropygi, was first used by Tamerlan Thorell in 1883. It means "tail rump", from Ancient Greek οὐροπύγιον (ouropygion), from οὐρά (oura) "tail" and πυγή (pygē) "rump" referring to the whip-like flagellum on the end of the pygidium, a small plate made up of the last three segments of the abdominal exoskeleton.

The classification and scientific name used for whip scorpions varies. Originally, Amblypygi (whip spiders), Uropygi and Schizomida (short-tailed whipscorpions) formed a single order of arachnids, Pedipalpi. Pedipalpi was later divided into two orders, Amblypygi and Uropygi (or Uropygida). Schizomida was then split off from Uropygi into a separate order. The remainder has either continued to be called by the same name, Uropygi, possibly distinguished as Uropygi sensu stricto, or called Thelyphonida. When the name Uropygi is used for the whip scorpions, the clade containing Uropygi and Schizomida may be called Thelyphonida, or Thelyphonida s.l. Conversely, when the name Thelyphonida is used for the whip scorpions alone, the parent clade may be called Uropygi, or Uropygi sensu lato. The table below summarizes the two usages. When the qualifications s.l. and s.s. are omitted, the names Uropygi and Thelyphonida are ambiguous.

Alternative nomenclature
English names	System 1	System 2	Recent families
	Clade Thelyphonida (Thelyphonida s.l.)	Clade Uropygi (Uropygi s.l.)	
whip scorpions	Uropygi s.s.	Thelyphonida s.s.	Thelyphonidae
short-tailed whip scorpions	Schizomida	Schizomida	Hubbardiidae, Protoschizomidae

Phylogenetic studies show the three groups, Amblypygi, Uropygi s.s. and Schizomida, to be closely related. The Uropygi s.s. and Schizomida likely diverged in the late Carboniferous, somewhere in the tropics of Pangaea.

- Pedipalpi
  - - Amblypygi
      whip spiders
  - - Thelyphonida s.l. (Uropygi s.l.)
      - Uropygi s.s. (Thelyphonida s.s.)
        whip scorpions
      - Schizomida
        short-tailed whip scorpions

== Description ==
Whip scorpions range from 25 to 85 mm (1.0 to 3.3 in) in length, with most species having a body no longer than 30 mm (1.2 in); the largest species, of the genus Mastigoproctus, can reach 85 mm (3.3 in). An extinct Mesoproctus from the Lower Cretaceous Crato Formation could be the same size. Because of their legs, claws, and "whip", though, they can appear much larger, and the heaviest specimen weighed was 12.4 grams (0.44 oz).

The opisthosoma consists of 12 segments. The first segment forms a pedicel, and each of the next eight segments has dorsal tergites. The last three segments are fused into closed rings, forming a pygidium that ends with a flagellum of 30–40 units.

Like the related orders Schizomida and Amblypygi, whip scorpions use only six legs for walking, with the first pair of legs serving as antennae-like sensory organs. All species also have very large scorpion-like pedipalps (pincers) but there is an additional large spine on each palpal tibia. They have one pair of median eyes at the front of the cephalothorax and up to five pairs of lateral eyes on each side of the head, a pattern also found in scorpions. Whip scorpions have no venom glands, but they have glands near the rear of their abdomen that can spray a combination of acetic acid and caprylic acid when they are bothered. The acetic acid gives this spray a vinegar-like smell, giving rise to the common name vinegaroon.

== Behaviour ==
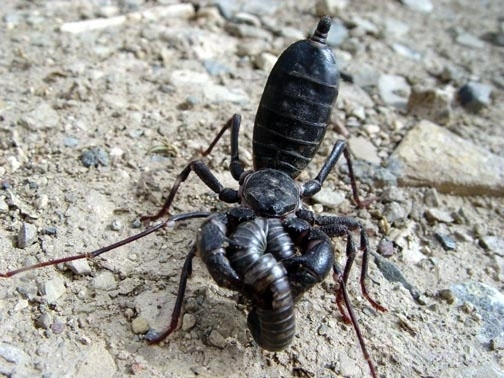
Mastigoproctus giganteus, a predator of millipedes

Whip scorpions are carnivorous, nocturnal hunters feeding mostly on insects, millipedes, scorpions, and terrestrial isopods, but sometimes on worms and slugs. Mastigoproctus sometimes preys on small vertebrates. The prey is crushed between special teeth on the inside of the trochanters (the second segment of the "legs") of the front appendages.

Males secrete a spermatophore (a united mass of sperm), which is transferred to the female following courtship behaviour, in which the male holds the ends of the female's first legs in his chelicerae. The spermatophore is deposited on the ground and picked up by the female using her genital area. In some genera, the male then uses his pedipalps to push the spermatophore into her body.

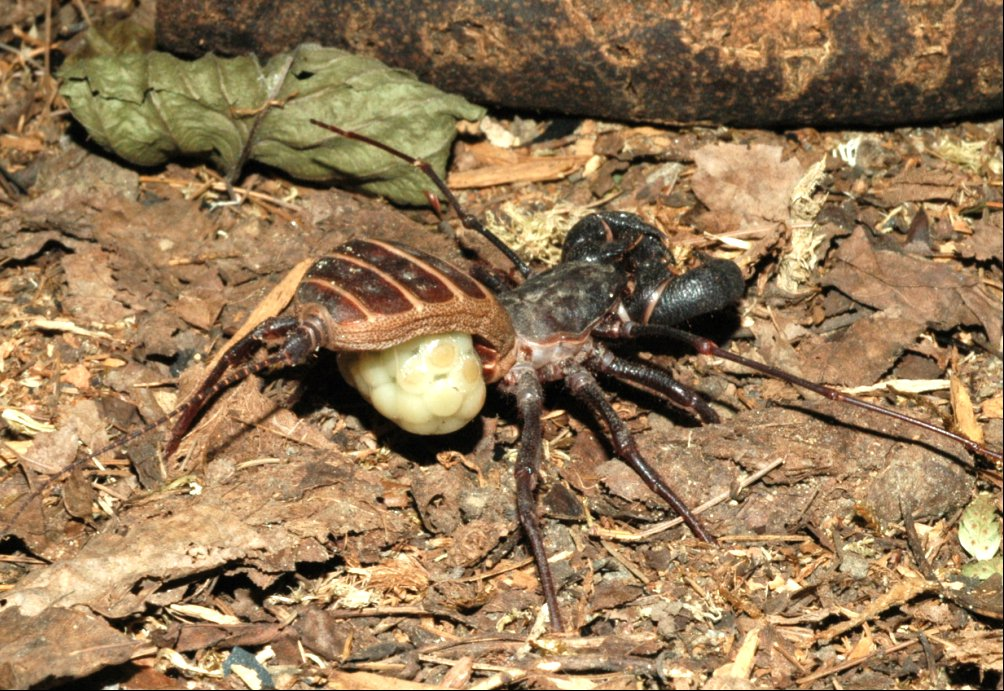
Mastigoproctus giganteus female with eggs

After a few months, the female will dig a large burrow and seal herself inside. Up to 40 eggs are extruded, within a membranous broodsac that preserves moisture and remains attached to the genital operculum and the fifth segment of the mother's ventral opisthosoma. The female refuses to eat and holds her opisthosoma in an upward arch so that the broodsac does not touch the ground for the next few months, as the eggs develop into postembryos. Appendages become visible.

The white young that hatch from the postembryos climb onto their mother's back and attach themselves there with special suckers. After the first moult, when they look like miniature adults but with bright red palps, they leave the burrow. The mother may live up to two more years. The young grow slowly, going through four moults in about four years before reaching adulthood. They live for up to another four years.

== Distribution and habitat ==
Whip scorpions are found in tropical and subtropical areas, excluding Europe and Australia. Also, only a single species is known from Africa: Etienneus africanus, probably a Gondwana relict, endemic to Senegal, the Gambia and Guinea-Bissau.

They usually dig burrows with their pedipalps, to which they transport their prey. They may also burrow under logs, rotting wood, rocks, and other natural debris. They prefer humid, dark places and avoid light. Mastigoproctus giganteus, the giant whip scorpion, is found in more arid areas, including Arizona and New Mexico.

== Subtaxa ==
As of 2026, the World Uropygi Catalog accepted the following 18 extant genera, all placed in the family Thelyphonidae:

- Etienneus Heurtault, 1984
- Ginosigma Speijer, 1936
- Glyptogluteus Rowland, 1973
- Hypoctonus Thorell, 1888
- Labochirus Pocock, 1894
- Mastigoproctus Pocock, 1894
- Mayacentrum Viquez & Armas, 2006
- Mimoscorpius Pocock, 1894
- Ravilops Víquez & Armas, 2005
- Sheylayongium Teruel, 2018
- Thelyphonellus Pocock, 1894
- Thelyphonoides Krehenwinkel, Curio, Tacud & Haupt, 2009
- Thelyphonus Latreille, 1802
- Typopeltis Pocock, 1894
- Uroproctus Pocock, 1894
- Valeriophonus Viquez & Armas, 2005
- Wounaan Botero-Trujillo, Moreno-González & Prendini, 2024
- Yekuana Botero-Trujillo, Moreno-González & Prendini, 2024

In addition, nine extinct genera were accepted, two within the family Thelyphonidae:

- †Mesoproctus Dunlop, 1998
- †Mesothelyphonus Cai & Huang, 2017

and seven unplaced as to family:

- †Burmathelyphonia Wunderlich, 2015
- †Geralinura Scudder, 1884
- †Inmontibusichnus Knecht, Benner, Dunlop & Renczkowski, 2023
- †Parageralinura Tetlie & Dunlop, 2008
- †Parilisthelyphonus Knecht, Benner, Dunlop & Renczkowski, 2023
- †Proschizomus Dunlop & Horrocks, 1996
- †Prothelyphonus Frič, 1904
