= Synsphyronus christopherdarwini =

Scientific classification
- Kingdom: Animalia
- Phylum: Arthropoda
- Subphylum: Chelicerata
- Class: Arachnida
- Order: Pseudoscorpiones
- Family: Garypidae
- Genus: Synsphyronus
- Species: S. christopherdarwini

Binomial name
- Synsphyronus christopherdarwini Harvey, 2012

Species of pseudoscorpion

Synsphyronus christopherdarwini is a species of pseudoscorpion in the Garypidae family. It is endemic to Australia. It was described in 2012 by Australian arachnologist Mark Harvey. The specific epithet christopherdarwini honours Christopher Darwin, who assisted in the collection of the type specimens as well as sponsoring the establishment of the reserve in which they were discovered.

== Description ==
Body lengths of males are 3.37–3.84 mm; those of females 4.00–4.31 mm. Colouration is generally dark yellowish-brown.

== Distribution and habitat ==
The species occurs in south-west Western Australia in the Wheatbelt. The type locality is a granite outcrop near Robins Dam in Charles Darwin Reserve, where the pseudoscorpions were found beneath exfoliating granite slabs.

== Behaviour ==
The pseudoscorpions are terrestrial predators.
