= Aldabrinus aldabrinus =

Conservation status
- Least Concern (IUCN 3.1)

Scientific classification
- Kingdom: Animalia
- Phylum: Arthropoda
- Subphylum: Chelicerata
- Class: Arachnida
- Order: Pseudoscorpiones
- Family: Garypinidae
- Genus: Aldabrinus
- Species: A. aldabrinus

Binomial name
- Aldabrinus aldabrinus Chamberlin, 1930

Species of pseudoscorpion

Aldabrinus aldabrinus is a species of pseudoscorpion that is known from Aldabra in the Seychelles and from Mozambique. It is suspected to be widespread along the east African coast. It is found in dry open woodland or scrub.
