= Synsphyronus paradoxus =

Scientific classification
- Kingdom: Animalia
- Phylum: Arthropoda
- Subphylum: Chelicerata
- Class: Arachnida
- Order: Pseudoscorpiones
- Family: Garypidae
- Genus: Synsphyronus
- Species: S. paradoxus

Binomial name
- Synsphyronus paradoxus Chamberlin, 1930

Species of pseudoscorpion

Synsphyronus paradoxus is a species of pseudoscorpion in the Garypidae family. It was described in 1930 by American arachnologist Joseph Conrad Chamberlin.

== Distribution and habitat ==
The species occurs in central and south-eastern Australia in the Lake Eyre and Murray–Darling basins in woodland habitats, often under bark. The type locality is Menindee.

== Behaviour ==
The pseudoscorpions are terrestrial predators.
