= Synsphyronus niger =

Scientific classification
- Kingdom: Animalia
- Phylum: Arthropoda
- Subphylum: Chelicerata
- Class: Arachnida
- Order: Pseudoscorpiones
- Family: Garypidae
- Genus: Synsphyronus
- Species: S. niger

Binomial name
- Synsphyronus niger Hoff, 1947

Species of pseudoscorpion

Synsphyronus niger is a species of pseudoscorpion in the Garypidae family. It is endemic to Australia. It was described in 1947 by American arachnologist Clarence Clayton Hoff.

== Description ==
The body length of the holotype male is 3.6 mm. The colour is mainly brown.

== Distribution and habitat ==
The species occurs in south-eastern Australia in woodland habitats. The type locality is Adelaide.

== Behaviour ==
The pseudoscorpions are terrestrial predators.
