= Synsphyronus mimetus =

Scientific classification
- Kingdom: Animalia
- Phylum: Arthropoda
- Subphylum: Chelicerata
- Class: Arachnida
- Order: Pseudoscorpiones
- Family: Garypidae
- Genus: Synsphyronus
- Species: S. mimetus

Binomial name
- Synsphyronus mimetus Chamberlin, 1943

Species of pseudoscorpion

Synsphyronus mimetus is a species of pseudoscorpion in the Garypidae family. It was described in 1943 by American arachnologist Joseph Conrad Chamberlin.

== Distribution and habitat ==
The species occurs in south-eastern Australia in coastal habitats. The type locality is Corny Point on the west coast of the Yorke Peninsula.

== Behaviour ==
The pseudoscorpions are terrestrial predators.
