= Solinus australiensis =

Scientific classification
- Kingdom: Animalia
- Phylum: Arthropoda
- Subphylum: Chelicerata
- Class: Arachnida
- Order: Pseudoscorpiones
- Family: Garypinidae
- Genus: Solinus
- Species: S. australiensis

Binomial name
- Solinus australiensis Chamberlin, 1930

Species of pseudoscorpion

Solinus australiensis is a species of pseudoscorpion in the Garypinidae family. It is endemic to Australia. It was described in 1930 by American arachnologist Joseph Conrad Chamberlin.

== Distribution and habitat ==
The species occurs in New South Wales and Victoria. The type locality is Barringun. The pseudoscorpions are found beneath rocks or tree bark.

== Behaviour ==
The pseudoscorpions are terrestrial predators.
