= Garypus longidigitus =

Scientific classification
- Kingdom: Animalia
- Phylum: Arthropoda
- Subphylum: Chelicerata
- Class: Arachnida
- Order: Pseudoscorpiones
- Family: Garypidae
- Genus: Garypus
- Species: G. longidigitus

Binomial name
- Garypus longidigitus Hoff, 1947

Species of pseudoscorpion

Garypus longidigitus is a species of pseudoscorpion in the Garypidae family. It was described in 1947 by American arachnologist Clarence Clayton Hoff. The specific epithet longidigitus refers to the very long and slender chelal fingers.

== Description ==
The body length of the female holotype is 4.4 mm. The colour is mainly brown.

== Distribution and habitat ==
The species occurs in Far North Queensland. The type locality is Waua Islet, in the Murray Islands of Torres Strait.

== Behaviour ==
The pseudoscorpions are terrestrial predators.
