= Synsphyronus attiguus =

Scientific classification
- Kingdom: Animalia
- Phylum: Arthropoda
- Subphylum: Chelicerata
- Class: Arachnida
- Order: Pseudoscorpiones
- Family: Garypidae
- Genus: Synsphyronus
- Species: S. attiguus

Binomial name
- Synsphyronus attiguus Harvey, 1987

Species of pseudoscorpion

Synsphyronus attiguus is a species of pseudoscorpion in the Garypidae family. It is endemic to Australia. It was described in 1987 by Australian arachnologist Mark Harvey. The specific epithet attiguus (Latin: 'touching' or bordering') refers to its close geographical and morphological relationship with Synsphyronus absitus.

== Description ==
The body length of the females is 3.7–4.2 mm; that of males 2.9–3.5 mm. Colouration is dark yellowish-brown.

== Distribution and habitat ==
The species occurs in the Flinders Ranges of South Australia. The type locality is Mernmerna, 33 km north of Hawker, where the holotype was found under a rock.

== Behaviour ==
The pseudoscorpions are terrestrial predators.
