= Synsphyronus mimulus =

Scientific classification
- Kingdom: Animalia
- Phylum: Arthropoda
- Subphylum: Chelicerata
- Class: Arachnida
- Order: Pseudoscorpiones
- Family: Garypidae
- Genus: Synsphyronus
- Species: S. mimulus

Binomial name
- Synsphyronus mimulus Chamberlin, 1943

Synonyms
- Synsphyronus (Maorigarypus) grayi Beier, 1975

Species of pseudoscorpion

Synsphyronus mimulus is a species of pseudoscorpion in the Garypidae family. It was described in 1943 by American arachnologist Joseph Conrad Chamberlin.

== Distribution and habitat ==
The species occurs in southern and eastern Australia. The type locality is Corny Point on the west coast of the Yorke Peninsula.

== Behaviour ==
The pseudoscorpions are terrestrial predators.
