= Anagarypus australianus =

Scientific classification
- Kingdom: Animalia
- Phylum: Arthropoda
- Subphylum: Chelicerata
- Class: Arachnida
- Order: Pseudoscorpiones
- Family: Garypidae
- Genus: Anagarypus
- Species: A. australianus

Binomial name
- Anagarypus australianus Muchmore, 1982

Species of pseudoscorpion

Anagarypus australianus is a species of pseudoscorpion in the Garypidae family. It was described in 1982 by American arachnologist William Muchmore. The specific epithet australianus refers to Australia, the country of its known distribution.

== Description ==
The body length of the holotype is 2.75 mm, with that of paratypes 2.85–4.05 mm. The colour is mainly dark brown, with light brown legs.

== Distribution and habitat ==
The species occurs in Far North Queensland beneath stones in coastal island habitats, including several on the Great Barrier Reef. The type locality is Nymph Island. It has also been recorded from Maria Island in the northern Gulf region of the Northern Territory.

== Behaviour ==
The pseudoscorpions are terrestrial predators.
