= Synsphyronus ellenae =

Scientific classification
- Kingdom: Animalia
- Phylum: Arthropoda
- Subphylum: Chelicerata
- Class: Arachnida
- Order: Pseudoscorpiones
- Family: Garypidae
- Genus: Synsphyronus
- Species: S. ellenae

Binomial name
- Synsphyronus ellenae Harvey, 2010

Species of pseudoscorpion

Synsphyronus ellenae is a species of pseudoscorpion in the Garypidae family. It is endemic to Australia. It was described in 2010 by Australian arachnologist Mark Harvey. The specific epithet ellenae honours the author’s daughter Ellen Harvey, who assisted in the collection of the type specimens.

== Description ==
Th body length of the male holotype is 4.03 mm; that of a female paratype 5.38 mm. Colouration is generally dark reddish-brown.

== Distribution and habitat ==
The species occurs in south-west Western Australia. The type locality is Kokerbin Rock in the Wheatbelt region, where the pseudoscorpions were found beneath exfoliating granite rocks.

== Behaviour ==
The pseudoscorpions are terrestrial predators.
