= Synsphyronus spatiosus =

Scientific classification
- Kingdom: Animalia
- Phylum: Arthropoda
- Subphylum: Chelicerata
- Class: Arachnida
- Order: Pseudoscorpiones
- Family: Garypidae
- Genus: Synsphyronus
- Species: S. spatiosus

Binomial name
- Synsphyronus spatiosus Harvey, 2022

Species of pseudoscorpion

Synsphyronus spatiosus is a species of pseudoscorpion in the Garypidae family. It is endemic to Australia. It was described in 2022 by Australian arachnologist Mark Harvey. The specific epithet spatiosus (Latin: 'spacious' or 'large') refers to both the large size of the species and of the type locality.

== Description ==
Body lengths of males are 3.34–4.04 mm; those of females 4.10–4.50 mm. Colouration is generally yellowish-brown.

== Distribution and habitat ==
The species occurs in Western Australia on granite outcrops in the Murchison bioregion. The type locality is Walga Rock, on Austin Downs station, where the pseudoscorpions were found beneath exfoliating granite slabs.

== Behaviour ==
The pseudoscorpions are terrestrial predators.
