= Synsphyronus francesae =

Scientific classification
- Kingdom: Animalia
- Phylum: Arthropoda
- Subphylum: Chelicerata
- Class: Arachnida
- Order: Pseudoscorpiones
- Family: Garypidae
- Genus: Synsphyronus
- Species: S. francesae

Binomial name
- Synsphyronus francesae Harvey, 2010

Species of pseudoscorpion

Synsphyronus francesae is a species of pseudoscorpion in the Garypidae family. It is endemic to Australia. It was described in 2010 by Australian arachnologist Mark Harvey. The specific epithet francesae honours the author’s daughter Frances Harvey, who assisted in the collection of the type specimens.

== Description ==
Body lengths of males are 3.76–4.35 mm; those of females 4.80–5.19 mm. Colouration is generally dark reddish-brown.

== Distribution and habitat ==
The species occurs on granite outcrops along the south coast of Western Australia. The type locality is Le Grand Beach in Cape Le Grand National Park, where the pseudoscorpions were found beneath exfoliating granite rocks.

== Behaviour ==
The pseudoscorpions are terrestrial predators.
