= Synsphyronus callus =

Scientific classification
- Kingdom: Animalia
- Phylum: Arthropoda
- Subphylum: Chelicerata
- Class: Arachnida
- Order: Pseudoscorpiones
- Family: Garypidae
- Genus: Synsphyronus
- Species: S. callus

Binomial name
- Synsphyronus callus Hoff, 1947

Species of pseudoscorpion

Synsphyronus callus is a species of pseudoscorpion in the Garypidae family. It is endemic to Australia. It was described in 1947 by American arachnologist Clarence Clayton Hoff.

== Description ==
The body length of the holotype female is 3.3 mm. The colour is brown.

== Distribution and habitat ==
The species occurs in south-west Western Australia in rocky coastal habitats. The type locality is Rottnest Island, with a paratype specimen obtained at Cottesloe Beach near Perth.

== Behaviour ==
The pseudoscorpions are terrestrial predators.
