= Synsphyronus alisonae =

Scientific classification
- Kingdom: Animalia
- Phylum: Arthropoda
- Subphylum: Chelicerata
- Class: Arachnida
- Order: Pseudoscorpiones
- Family: Garypidae
- Genus: Synsphyronus
- Species: S. alisonae

Binomial name
- Synsphyronus alisonae Harvey, 2022

Species of pseudoscorpion

Synsphyronus alisonae is a species of pseudoscorpion in the Garypidae family. It is endemic to Australia. It was described in 2022 by Australian arachnologist Mark Harvey. The specific epithet alisonae honours Alison Jones.

== Description ==
Body lengths of males are 4.90–4.99 mm; those of females 5.46–5.96 mm. Colouration is generally dark yellowish-brown.

== Distribution and habitat ==
The species occurs in south-west Western Australia on granite outcrops in the Coolgardie bioregion. The type locality is Victoria Rock Nature Reserve, 76 km south of Coolgardfie, where the pseudoscorpions were found beneath exfoliating granite slabs.

== Behaviour ==
The pseudoscorpions are terrestrial predators.
