= Synsphyronus ejuncidus =

Scientific classification
- Kingdom: Animalia
- Phylum: Arthropoda
- Subphylum: Chelicerata
- Class: Arachnida
- Order: Pseudoscorpiones
- Family: Garypidae
- Genus: Synsphyronus
- Species: S. ejuncidus

Binomial name
- Synsphyronus ejuncidus Harvey, 1987

Species of pseudoscorpion

Synsphyronus ejuncidus is a species of pseudoscorpion in the Garypidae family. It is endemic to Australia. It was described in 1987 by Australian arachnologist Mark Harvey. The specific epithet ejuncidus (Latin: 'rushlike' or 'slender') refers to the pseudoscorpions’ thin pedipalpal appendages.

== Description ==
The body length of females is 3.4–4.0 mm; that of males is 2.9–3.0 mm. Colouration is light yellowish-brown.

== Distribution and habitat ==
The species occurs in the Northern Territory and Western Australia. The type locality is 8 km south of Knob Peak on Carlton Hill Station in the east Kimberley region. It has also been recorded from Wigley Waterhole on the Todd River, 8 km north of Alice Springs.

== Behaviour ==
The pseudoscorpions are terrestrial predators.
