= Garypus titanius =

Conservation status
- Critically Endangered (IUCN 3.1)

Scientific classification
- Kingdom: Animalia
- Phylum: Arthropoda
- Subphylum: Chelicerata
- Class: Arachnida
- Order: Pseudoscorpiones
- Family: Garypidae
- Genus: Garypus
- Species: G. titanius

Binomial name
- Garypus titanius Beier, 1961

Species of pseudoscorpion

Garypus titanius, the giant pseudoscorpion, is the largest species of pseudoscorpion—small, scorpion-looking creatures—in the world. Critically endangered, it is restricted to Boatswain Bird Island, a small rocky island off Ascension Island in the South Atlantic Ocean. Pseudoscorpions are venomous arachnids (a group that includes spiders, ticks, and scorpions) and are generally tiny—around 3 mm (.1 in) long. The giant pseudoscorpion, though, can grow to five times that size at 11 mm (.5 in). It lives among seabird colonies, feeding mainly at night on smaller prey such as insects. It belongs to the Garypidae family.

The giant pseudoscorpion is threatened by non-native insects and other animals, such as mice. It has died out on the larger Ascension Island, a remote volcanic island and British overseas territory that was discovered in 1501.
