= Synsphyronus dorothyae =

Scientific classification
- Kingdom: Animalia
- Phylum: Arthropoda
- Subphylum: Chelicerata
- Class: Arachnida
- Order: Pseudoscorpiones
- Family: Garypidae
- Genus: Synsphyronus
- Species: S. dorothyae

Binomial name
- Synsphyronus dorothyae Harvey, 1987

Species of pseudoscorpion

Synsphyronus dorothyae is a species of pseudoscorpion in the Garypidae family. It is endemic to Australia. It was described in 1987 by Australian arachnologist Mark Harvey. The specific epithet dorothyae honours Dorothy Cukier for her assistance in collecting the holotype specimen.

== Description ==
The body lengths of the two female specimens are 3.8 and 4.2 mm. Colouration is dark yellowish-brown.

== Distribution and habitat ==
The species occurs in arid South Australia and Western Australia. The type locality is 67 km south-east of Coolgardie on the Eyre Highway, and a paratype was obtained from the eastern side of Serpentine Lake. Both were found beneath the bark of Eucalyptus trees.

== Behaviour ==
The pseudoscorpions are terrestrial predators.
