= Synsphyronus gigas =

Scientific classification
- Kingdom: Animalia
- Phylum: Arthropoda
- Subphylum: Chelicerata
- Class: Arachnida
- Order: Pseudoscorpiones
- Family: Garypidae
- Genus: Synsphyronus
- Species: S. gigas

Binomial name
- Synsphyronus gigas Beier, 1971

Species of pseudoscorpion

Synsphyronus gigas is a species of pseudoscorpion in the Garypidae family. It is endemic to Australia. It was described in 1971 by Austrian arachnologist Max Beier.

== Description ==
The body length of the male paratype is 4.5 mm; that of female specimens 5–6 mm. Colouration is dull reddish-brown, the male somewhat darker.

== Distribution and habitat ==
The species occurs in Western Australia in the Great Victoria Desert. The type locality is 18 km east of Milne Rock, where the pseudoscorpions were found beneath stones.

== Behaviour ==
The pseudoscorpions are terrestrial predators.
