= Garypus ranalliorum =

Scientific classification
- Kingdom: Animalia
- Phylum: Arthropoda
- Subphylum: Chelicerata
- Class: Arachnida
- Order: Pseudoscorpiones
- Family: Garypidae
- Genus: Garypus
- Species: G. ranalliorum

Binomial name
- Garypus ranalliorum Harvey, 2020

Species of pseudoscorpion

Garypus ranalliorum is a species of pseudoscorpion in the Garypidae family. It was described in 2020 by Australian arachnologist Mark Harvey.

== Distribution and habitat ==
The species occurs in the Kimberley region of North West Australia. The type locality is Mitchell Falls.
