= Aldabrinus =

Scientific classification
- Kingdom: Animalia
- Phylum: Arthropoda
- Subphylum: Chelicerata
- Class: Arachnida
- Order: Pseudoscorpiones
- Family: Garypinidae
- Genus: Aldabrinus; Chamberlin, 1930

Type species
- Aldabrinus aldabrinus Chamberlin, 1930

Species
- A. aldabrinus Chamberlin, 1930; A. floridanus Muchmore, 1974; A. novaecaledoniae (Beier, 1966); A. rixi Harvey, 2023

Synonyms
- Paraldabrinus Beier, 1966

Genus of pseudoscorpions

Aldabrinus is a genus of pseudoscorpions in the family Garypinidae.

== Taxonomy and history ==
The genus Aldabrinus was established by American arachnologist Joseph Conrad Chamberlin in 1930 to accommodate Aldabrinus aldabrinus, an unusual species described from the Aldabra Islands. No further specimens of Aldabrinus would be described until 1974, when William B. Muchmore described Aldabrinus floridanus from Key Largo, Florida. In 2023, Australian arachnologist Mark Harvey concluded that the species Paraldabrinus novaecaledoniae, described by Austrian arachnologist Max Beier in 1966, was instead a species of Aldabrinus, Aldabrinus novaecaledoniae, rendering the monotypic genus Paraldabrinus a synonym of Aldabrinus. The same 2023 paper by Harvey would describe the newest species of Aldabrinus, Aldabrinus rixi from Western Australia, and place the genus in the subfamily Garypininae.

== Species ==
This genus includes the following species:

- Aldabrinus aldabrinus Chamberlin, 1930
- Aldabrinus floridanus Muchmore, 1974
- Aldabrinus novaecaledoniae (Beier, 1966)
- Aldabrinus rixi Harvey, 2023
