= Synsphyronus marinae =

Scientific classification
- Kingdom: Animalia
- Phylum: Arthropoda
- Subphylum: Chelicerata
- Class: Arachnida
- Order: Pseudoscorpiones
- Family: Garypidae
- Genus: Synsphyronus
- Species: S. marinae

Binomial name
- Synsphyronus marinae Cullen & Harvey, 2021

Species of pseudoscorpion

Synsphyronus marinae is a species of pseudoscorpion in the Garypidae family. It is endemic to Australia. It was described in 2021 by Australian arachnologists Karen Cullen and Mark Harvey. The specific epithet marinae honours Marina Cheng for her companionship during Bush Blitz expeditions and for her research on Hemiptera.

== Description ==
The body lengths of males are 2.89–3.30 mm; those of females are 3.76–4.36 mm. Colouration is generally reddish-brown.

== Distribution and habitat ==
The species occurs in the Top End of the Northern Territory. The type locality is Herbert Bluff in the Wongalara Sanctuary, where the pseudoscorpions were found beneath sandstone rocks.

== Behaviour ==
The pseudoscorpions are terrestrial predators.
