= Garypus postlei =

Scientific classification
- Kingdom: Animalia
- Phylum: Arthropoda
- Subphylum: Chelicerata
- Class: Arachnida
- Order: Pseudoscorpiones
- Family: Garypidae
- Genus: Garypus
- Species: G. postlei

Binomial name
- Garypus postlei Harvey, 2020

Species of pseudoscorpion

Garypus postlei is a species of pseudoscorpion in the Garypidae family. It was described in 2020 by Australian arachnologist Mark Harvey.

== Distribution and habitat ==
The species occurs in coastal Arnhem Land in the Top End of the Northern Territory. The type locality is Mardbal Bay on South Goulburn Island.
