= Synsphyronus heptatrichus =

Scientific classification
- Kingdom: Animalia
- Phylum: Arthropoda
- Subphylum: Chelicerata
- Class: Arachnida
- Order: Pseudoscorpiones
- Family: Garypidae
- Genus: Synsphyronus
- Species: S. heptatrichus

Binomial name
- Synsphyronus heptatrichus Harvey, 1987

Species of pseudoscorpion

Synsphyronus heptatrichus is a species of pseudoscorpion in the Garypidae family. It is endemic to Australia. It was described in 1987 by Australian arachnologist Mark Harvey. The specific epithet heptatrichus comes from the Greek hepta ('seven') and trichos ('hair'), referring to the presence of seven trichobothria on the fixed chelal finger, the only character distinguishing the species from S. paradoxus.

== Description ==
The body length of the male holotype is 2.5 mm; that of the female paratype is 2.9 mm. Colouration is reddish-brown.

== Distribution and habitat ==
The species occurs in the Top End of the Northern Territory. The type locality is 13.5 km south-east of Roper Bar, where the holotype was found beneath the bark of a tree.

== Behaviour ==
The pseudoscorpions are terrestrial predators.
