= Protogarypinus giganteus =

Scientific classification
- Kingdom: Animalia
- Phylum: Arthropoda
- Subphylum: Chelicerata
- Class: Arachnida
- Order: Pseudoscorpiones
- Family: Garypinidae
- Genus: Protogarypinus
- Species: P. giganteus

Binomial name
- Protogarypinus giganteus Beier, 1954

Species of pseudoscorpion

Protogarypinus giganteus is a species of pseudoscorpion in the Garypinidae family. It is endemic to Australia. It was described in 1954 by Austrian arachnologist Max Beier.

== Distribution and habitat ==
The species occurs in south-west Western Australia. The type locality is near the mouth of the Denmark River, Denmark, where the female holotype was found under tree bark.

== Behaviour ==
The pseudoscorpions are terrestrial predators.
