= Garypus dissitus =

Scientific classification
- Kingdom: Animalia
- Phylum: Arthropoda
- Subphylum: Chelicerata
- Class: Arachnida
- Order: Pseudoscorpiones
- Family: Garypidae
- Genus: Garypus
- Species: G. dissitus

Binomial name
- Garypus dissitus Harvey, 2020

Species of pseudoscorpion

Garypus dissitus is a species of pseudoscorpion in the Garypidae family. It was described in 2020 by Australian arachnologist Mark Harvey.

== Distribution and habitat ==
The species occurs in the Australian territory of the Cocos (Keeling) Islands in the eastern Indian Ocean. The type locality is West Island, where the holotype was found in the hollow branch of a dead standing tree on the beach.
