= Synsphyronus pharangites =

Scientific classification
- Kingdom: Animalia
- Phylum: Arthropoda
- Subphylum: Chelicerata
- Class: Arachnida
- Order: Pseudoscorpiones
- Family: Garypidae
- Genus: Synsphyronus
- Species: S. pharangites

Binomial name
- Synsphyronus pharangites Cullen & Harvey, 2021

Species of pseudoscorpion

Synsphyronus pharangites is a species of pseudoscorpion in the Garypidae family. It is endemic to Australia. It was described in 2021 by Australian arachnologists Karen Cullen and Mark Harvey. The specific epithet pharangites (Greek: 'of a gully') refers to the type locality.

== Description ==
The body length of the male holotype is 2.72 mm; those of females are 2.94–3.47 mm. Colouration is generally reddish-brown.

== Distribution and habitat ==
The species occurs in the Carnarvon bioregion of North West Australia. The type locality is Shothole Canyon Road in the Cape Range. The pseudoscorpions were found beneath the bark of a Corymbia hamersleyana tree.

== Behaviour ==
The pseudoscorpions are terrestrial predators.
