= Garypus latens =

Scientific classification
- Kingdom: Animalia
- Phylum: Arthropoda
- Subphylum: Chelicerata
- Class: Arachnida
- Order: Pseudoscorpiones
- Family: Garypidae
- Genus: Garypus
- Species: G. latens

Binomial name
- Garypus latens Harvey, 2020

Species of pseudoscorpion

Garypus latens is a species of pseudoscorpion in the Garypidae family. It was described in 2020 by Australian arachnologist Mark Harvey.

== Distribution and habitat ==
The species occurs in North West Australia. The type locality is Barrow Island, where the holotype was found in the rocky intertidal zone of a beach.
