= Garypus weipa =

Scientific classification
- Kingdom: Animalia
- Phylum: Arthropoda
- Subphylum: Chelicerata
- Class: Arachnida
- Order: Pseudoscorpiones
- Family: Garypidae
- Genus: Garypus
- Species: G. weipa

Binomial name
- Garypus weipa Harvey, 2020

Species of pseudoscorpion

Garypus weipa is a species of pseudoscorpion in the Garypidae family. It was described in 2020 by Australian arachnologist Mark Harvey. The specific epithet weipa refers to the type locality.

== Distribution and habitat ==
The species occurs on the Cape York Peninsula in Far North Queensland. The type locality is the Pennefather River, near the bauxite-mining town of Weipa, where the holotype was found on driftwood.
