= Synsphyronus gurdoni =

Scientific classification
- Kingdom: Animalia
- Phylum: Arthropoda
- Subphylum: Chelicerata
- Class: Arachnida
- Order: Pseudoscorpiones
- Family: Garypidae
- Genus: Synsphyronus
- Species: S. gurdoni

Binomial name
- Synsphyronus gurdoni Harvey, Abrams & Burger, 2015

Species of pseudoscorpion

Synsphyronus gurdoni is a species of pseudoscorpion in the Garypidae family. It is endemic to Australia. It was described in 2015 by Australian arachnologist Mark Harvey. The specific epithet gurdoni honours John Gurdon for his contributions to developmental biology.

== Description ==
The body lengths of males are 2.35–2.65 mm; those of females are 3.125–3.34 mm. Colouration is generally reddish-brown.

== Distribution and habitat ==
The species occurs in North West Australia. The type locality is Barrow Island off the Pilbara coast, where the pseudoscorpions were found in plant litter and soil across the eastern part of the island.

== Behaviour ==
The pseudoscorpions are terrestrial predators.
