= Synsphyronus nullarborensis =

Scientific classification
- Kingdom: Animalia
- Phylum: Arthropoda
- Subphylum: Chelicerata
- Class: Arachnida
- Order: Pseudoscorpiones
- Family: Garypidae
- Genus: Synsphyronus
- Species: S. nullarborensis

Binomial name
- Synsphyronus nullarborensis Beier, 1969

Species of pseudoscorpion

Synsphyronus nullarborensis is a species of pseudoscorpion in the Garypidae family. It is endemic to Australia. It was described in 1969 by Austrian arachnologist Max Beier.

== Distribution and habitat ==
The species occurs on the Nullarbor Plain of South Australia and Western Australia. The type locality is Toolinna Rockhole.

== Behaviour ==
The pseudoscorpions are terrestrial predators.
