= Synsphyronus =

Scientific classification
- Kingdom: Animalia
- Phylum: Arthropoda
- Subphylum: Chelicerata
- Class: Arachnida
- Order: Pseudoscorpiones
- Family: Garypidae
- Genus: Synsphyronus; Chamberlin, 1930

Type species
- Synsphyronus paradoxus Chamberlin, 1930

Synonyms
- Maorigarypus Chamberlin, 1930; Idiogarypus Chamberlin, 1943

Genus of pseudoscorpions

Synsphyronus is a genus of pseudoscorpions in the Garypidae family. It was described in 1930 by American arachnologist Joseph Conrad Chamberlin. Its distribution is mainly in Australia, but also extends to New Zealand and New Caledonia.

== Species ==
The genus contains the following species:

- Synsphyronus absitus Harvey, 1987
- Synsphyronus alisonae Harvey, 2022
- Synsphyronus amplissimus Harvey, 1987
- Synsphyronus apimelus Harvey, 1987
- Synsphyronus attiguus Harvey, 1987
- Synsphyronus bounites Harvey, 1987
- Synsphyronus callus Hoff, 1947
- Synsphyronus christopherdarwini Harvey, 2012
- Synsphyronus codyi Cullen and Harvey, 2021
- Synsphyronus dewae Beier, 1969
- Synsphyronus dorothyae Harvey, 1987
- Synsphyronus ejuncidus Harvey, 1987
- Synsphyronus elegans Beier, 1954
- Synsphyronus ellenae Harvey, 2010
- Synsphyronus francesae Harvey, 2010
- Synsphyronus gigas Beier, 1971
- Synsphyronus gracilis Harvey, 1987
- Synsphyronus greensladeae Harvey, 1987
- Synsphyronus gurdoni Harvey, Abrams and Burger, 2015
- Synsphyronus hadronennus Harvey, 1987
- Synsphyronus hansenii (With, 1908)
- Synsphyronus heptatrichus Harvey, 1987
- Synsphyronus inglisorum Harvey, 2023
- Synsphyronus lathrius Harvey, 1987
- Synsphyronus leo Harvey, 1987
- Synsphyronus lineatus Beier, 1966
- Synsphyronus magnus Hoff, 1947
- Synsphyronus marinae Cullen and Harvey, 2021
- Synsphyronus meganennus Harvey, 1987
- Synsphyronus melanochelatus (Chamberlin, 1930)
- Synsphyronus mimetus Chamberlin, 1943
- Synsphyronus mimulus Chamberlin, 1943
- Synsphyronus niger Hoff, 1947
- Synsphyronus nullarborensis Beier, 1969
- Synsphyronus paradoxus Chamberlin, 1930
- Synsphyronus patricki Cullen and Harvey, 2021
- Synsphyronus pharangites Cullen and Harvey, 2021
- Synsphyronus platnicki Harvey, 2020
- Synsphyronus samueli Cullen and Harvey, 2021
- Synsphyronus sertus Cullen and Harvey, 2021
- Synsphyronus silveirai Harvey, 1987
- Synsphyronus spatiosus Harvey, 2022
- Synsphyronus tenuis Harvey, 2022
- Synsphyronus viridis (Tubb, 1937)
- Synsphyronus xynus Cullen and Harvey, 2021
