= Synsphyronus dewae =

Scientific classification
- Kingdom: Animalia
- Phylum: Arthropoda
- Subphylum: Chelicerata
- Class: Arachnida
- Order: Pseudoscorpiones
- Family: Garypidae
- Genus: Synsphyronus
- Species: S. dewae

Binomial name
- Synsphyronus dewae Beier, 1969

Species of pseudoscorpion

Synsphyronus dewae is a species of pseudoscorpion in the Garypidae family. It is endemic to Australia. It was described in 1969 by Austrian arachnologist Max Beier.

== Distribution and habitat ==
The species occurs in South Australia in woodland habitats. The type locality is Truro, 80 km north-east of Adelaide.

== Behaviour ==
The pseudoscorpions are terrestrial predators.
