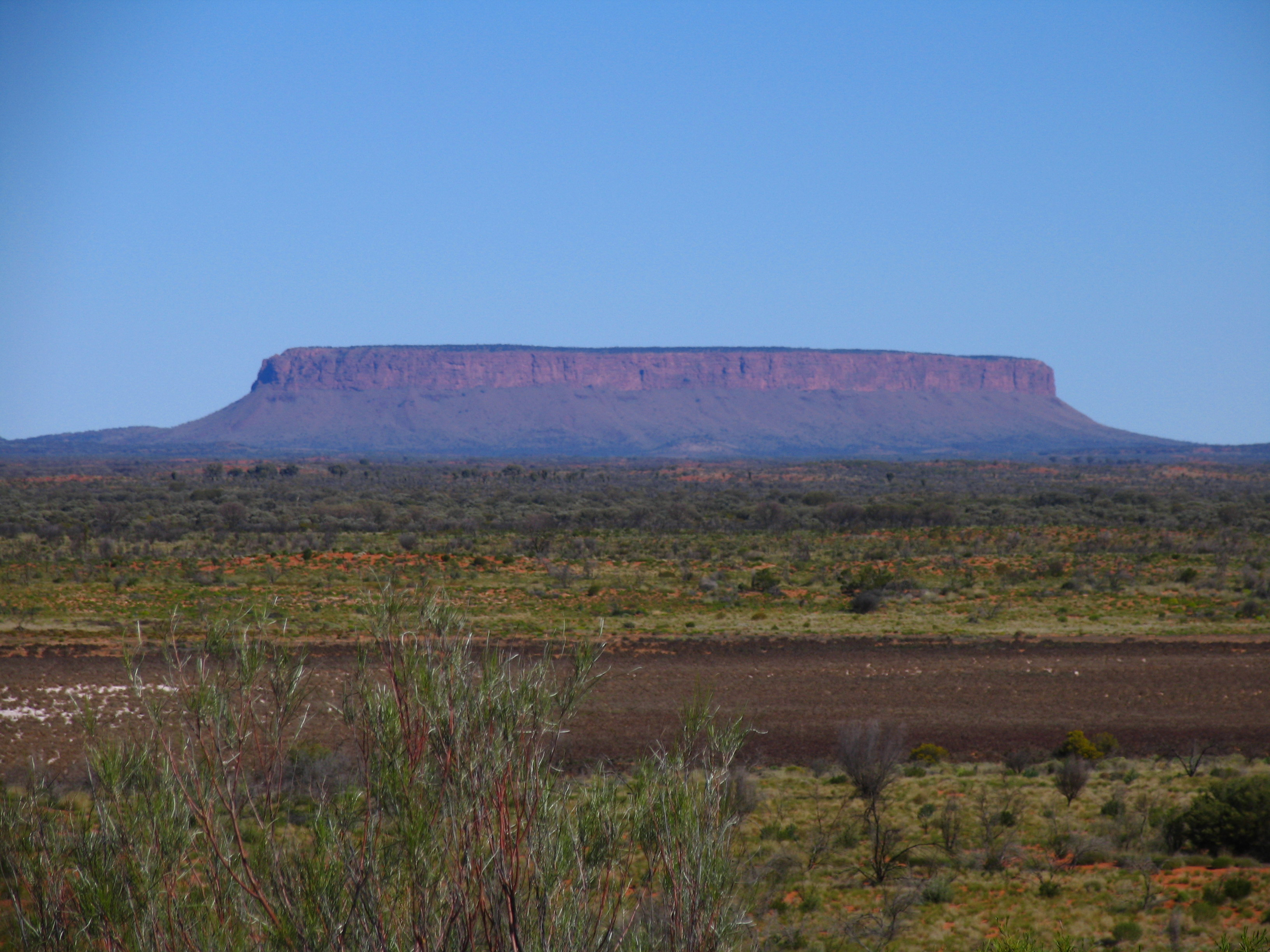
- Mount Conner is the only site from which this species is known

Scientific classification
- Kingdom: Animalia
- Phylum: Arthropoda
- Subphylum: Chelicerata
- Class: Arachnida
- Order: Pseudoscorpiones
- Family: Garypidae
- Genus: Synsphyronus
- Species: S. amplissimus

Binomial name
- Synsphyronus amplissimus Harvey, 1987

= Synsphyronus amplissimus =

Species of pseudoscorpion

Synsphyronus amplissimus is a species of pseudoscorpion in the Garypidae family. It is endemic to Australia. It was described in 1987 by Australian arachnologist Mark Harvey. The specific epithet amplissimus (Latin: 'largest') refers to its size relative to its congeners.

== Description ==
The body length of females is 5.6–5.9 mm. Colouration is reddish-brown.

== Distribution and habitat ==
The species occurs in the southern Northern Territory. The type locality is Mount Conner.

== Behaviour ==
The pseudoscorpions are terrestrial predators.
