= Synsphyronus lathrius =

Scientific classification
- Kingdom: Animalia
- Phylum: Arthropoda
- Subphylum: Chelicerata
- Class: Arachnida
- Order: Pseudoscorpiones
- Family: Garypidae
- Genus: Synsphyronus
- Species: S. lathrius

Binomial name
- Synsphyronus lathrius Harvey, 1987

Species of pseudoscorpion

Synsphyronus lathrius is a species of pseudoscorpion in the Garypidae family. It is endemic to Australia. It was described in 1987 by Australian arachnologist Mark Harvey. The specific epithet lathrius comes from the Greek lathrios ('hidden' or 'stealthy'), referring to the superficial similarity this species has with S. niger, with which it has been confused.

== Description ==
The body length of the males is 3.4–3.8 mm; that of females is 3.7–4.6 mm. Colouration is dull yellowish-brown.

== Distribution and habitat ==
The species occurs in Western Australia. The type locality is 98 km east-north-east of Norseman, where the holotype was found beneath stones. Other specimens have been found under eucalypt bark.

== Behaviour ==
The pseudoscorpions are terrestrial predators.
