= Synsphyronus sertus =

Scientific classification
- Kingdom: Animalia
- Phylum: Arthropoda
- Subphylum: Chelicerata
- Class: Arachnida
- Order: Pseudoscorpiones
- Family: Garypidae
- Genus: Synsphyronus
- Species: S. sertus

Binomial name
- Synsphyronus sertus Cullen & Harvey, 2021

Species of pseudoscorpion

Synsphyronus sertus is a species of pseudoscorpion in the Garypidae family. It is endemic to Australia. It was described in 2021 by Australian arachnologists Karen Cullen and Mark Harvey. The specific epithet sertus (Latin: 'join' or 'knit') refers to the fused metatarsi and tarsi.

== Description ==
The body lengths of males are 2.96–3.29 mm; those of females 3.34–3.73 mm. Colouration is generally reddish-brown with paired darker patches.

== Distribution and habitat ==
The species occurs in the southern Northern Territory. The type locality is Henbury Station in the James Range of the MacDonnell Ranges bioregion, some 130 km south of Alice Springs. The pseudoscorpions were found under shaded sandstone rocks in a south-facing gully.

== Behaviour ==
The pseudoscorpions are terrestrial predators.
