= Synsphyronus greensladeae =

Scientific classification
- Kingdom: Animalia
- Phylum: Arthropoda
- Subphylum: Chelicerata
- Class: Arachnida
- Order: Pseudoscorpiones
- Family: Garypidae
- Genus: Synsphyronus
- Species: S. greensladeae

Binomial name
- Synsphyronus greensladeae Harvey, 1987

Species of pseudoscorpion

Synsphyronus greensladeae is a species of pseudoscorpion in the Garypidae family. It is endemic to Australia. It was described in 1987 by Australian arachnologist Mark Harvey. The specific epithet greensladeae honours Penny Greenslade for her efforts in collecting pseudoscorpions.

== Description ==
The body length of the male holotype is 3.1 mm; that of a female paratype is 3.9 mm. Colouration is dull reddish-brown.

== Distribution and habitat ==
The species occurs in the southern Eyre Peninsula region of South Australia. The type locality is the summit of the Marble Range, near Wangary.

== Behaviour ==
The pseudoscorpions are terrestrial predators.
