= Oreolpium semotum =

Scientific classification
- Kingdom: Animalia
- Phylum: Arthropoda
- Subphylum: Chelicerata
- Class: Arachnida
- Order: Pseudoscorpiones
- Family: Garypinidae
- Genus: Oreolpium
- Species: O. semotum

Binomial name
- Oreolpium semotum Harvey & Stahlavsky, 2009

Species of pseudoscorpion

Oreolpium semotum is a species of pseudoscorpion in the Garypinidae family. It was described in 2009 by arachnologists Mark Harvey and Frantisek Stahlavsky. The specific epithet semotum (Latin: 'distant' or 'far-off') refers to the wide geographical separation of the two known species in the genus.

== Description ==
The body length of the male holotype is 2.48 mm; that of the female paratype 3.23 mm. The colour is generally very pale, with the pedipalps and front of the carapace slightly darker.

== Distribution and habitat ==
The species occurs in Tasmania. The type locality is The Needles Picnic Ground in Southwest National Park, where the pseudoscorpions were found under tree bark.

== Behaviour ==
The pseudoscorpions are terrestrial predators.
