= Garypus malgaryungu =

Scientific classification
- Kingdom: Animalia
- Phylum: Arthropoda
- Subphylum: Chelicerata
- Class: Arachnida
- Order: Pseudoscorpiones
- Family: Garypidae
- Genus: Garypus
- Species: G. malgaryungu

Binomial name
- Garypus malgaryungu Harvey, 2020

Species of pseudoscorpion

Garypus malgaryungu is a species of pseudoscorpion in the Garypidae family. It was described in 2020 by Australian arachnologist Mark Harvey. The specific epithet malgaryungu refers to the type locality.

== Distribution and habitat ==
The species occurs in coastal northern Australia. The type locality is Malgaryungu, a coastal lagoon in east Arnhem Land, Northern Territory, where the holotype was found on driftwood. A paratype specimen has also been obtained from a rotting driftwood log at Boydong Island in the Yamarrinh Wachangan Islands National Park at the northern end of the Cape York Peninsula, Far North Queensland.
