= Synsphyronus gracilis =

Scientific classification
- Kingdom: Animalia
- Phylum: Arthropoda
- Subphylum: Chelicerata
- Class: Arachnida
- Order: Pseudoscorpiones
- Family: Garypidae
- Genus: Synsphyronus
- Species: S. gracilis

Binomial name
- Synsphyronus gracilis Harvey, 1987

Species of pseudoscorpion

Synsphyronus gracilis is a species of pseudoscorpion in the Garypidae family. It is endemic to Australia. It was described in 1987 by Australian arachnologist Mark Harvey. The specific epithet gracilis (Latin: 'slender') refers to the pseudoscorpion’s slender appendages.

== Description ==
The body length of the female holotype is 3.9 mm. Colouration is pale yellowish-brown.

== Distribution and habitat ==
The species occurs in the Pilbara region of North West Australia. The type locality is Marillana Station.

== Behaviour ==
The pseudoscorpions are terrestrial predators.
