= Anagarypus heatwolei =

Scientific classification
- Kingdom: Animalia
- Phylum: Arthropoda
- Subphylum: Chelicerata
- Class: Arachnida
- Order: Pseudoscorpiones
- Family: Garypidae
- Genus: Anagarypus
- Species: A. heatwolei

Binomial name
- Anagarypus heatwolei Muchmore, 1982

Species of pseudoscorpion

Anagarypus heatwolei is a species of pseudoscorpion in the Garypidae family. It was described in 1982 by American arachnologist William Muchmore. The specific epithet heatwolei honours zoologist Harold Heatwole, who collected the type specimens.

== Description ==
The body length of the holotype female is 4.86 mm.

== Distribution and habitat ==
The species occurs in North West Australia. The type locality is Barrow Island, off the Pilbara coast, where specimens were found beneath stones on a rocky headland.

== Behaviour ==
The pseudoscorpions are terrestrial predators.
