= Synsphyronus meganennus =

Scientific classification
- Kingdom: Animalia
- Phylum: Arthropoda
- Subphylum: Chelicerata
- Class: Arachnida
- Order: Pseudoscorpiones
- Family: Garypidae
- Genus: Synsphyronus
- Species: S. meganennus

Binomial name
- Synsphyronus meganennus Harvey, 1987

Species of pseudoscorpion

Synsphyronus meganennus is a species of pseudoscorpion in the Garypidae family. It is endemic to Australia. It was described in 1987 by Australian arachnologist Mark Harvey. The specific epithet meganennus comes from Greek mega ('large') and nennos ('uncle'), with reference to the close relationship the species has with S. hadronennus, S. paradoxus and S. heptatrichus.

== Description ==
Body lengths are 2.8–3.3 mm. Colouration is dark reddish-brown.

== Distribution and habitat ==
The species occurs in eastern New South Wales in the Newcastle area. The type locality is Great Sugarloaf Mountain, near West Wallsend, where the pseudoscorpions were found beneath eucalypt bark.

== Behaviour ==
The pseudoscorpions are terrestrial predators.
