= Synsphyronus hansenii =

Scientific classification
- Kingdom: Animalia
- Phylum: Arthropoda
- Subphylum: Chelicerata
- Class: Arachnida
- Order: Pseudoscorpiones
- Family: Garypidae
- Genus: Synsphyronus
- Species: S. hansenii

Binomial name
- Synsphyronus hansenii (With, 1908)

Synonyms
- Garypus hansenii With, 1908; Synsphyronus (Maorigarypus) gisleni Beier, 1954; Synsphyronus (Maorigarypus) fallaciosus Beier, 1966

Species of pseudoscorpion

Synsphyronus hansenii is a species of pseudoscorpion in the Garypidae family. It was described in 1908 by Danish arachnologist Carl Johannes With. The specific epithet references Danish zoologist Hans Jacob Hansen.

== Distribution and habitat ==
The species occurs in south-western and south-eastern Australia in woodland habitats, often under bark. The type locality is Tasmania.

== Behaviour ==
The pseudoscorpions are terrestrial predators.
