= Synsphyronus apimelus =

Scientific classification
- Kingdom: Animalia
- Phylum: Arthropoda
- Subphylum: Chelicerata
- Class: Arachnida
- Order: Pseudoscorpiones
- Family: Garypidae
- Genus: Synsphyronus
- Species: S. apimelus

Binomial name
- Synsphyronus apimelus Harvey, 1987

Species of pseudoscorpion

Synsphyronus apimelus is a species of pseudoscorpion in the Garypidae family. It is endemic to Australia. It was described in 1987 by Australian arachnologist Mark Harvey. The specific epithet apimelus comes from the Greek apimelos ('lean' or 'without fat'), with reference to the slenderness of the pedipalps.

== Description ==
The body length of the female holotype is 4.2 mm; that of a male paratype 3.4 mm. Colouration is dark reddish-brown.

== Distribution and habitat ==
The species occurs in south-west Western Australia. The type locality is Toolbrunup peak in the Stirling Range, where specimens were found under boulders of scree.

== Behaviour ==
The pseudoscorpions are terrestrial predators.
