= Anagarypus =

Scientific classification
- Kingdom: Animalia
- Phylum: Arthropoda
- Subphylum: Chelicerata
- Class: Arachnida
- Order: Pseudoscorpiones
- Family: Garypidae
- Genus: Anagarypus; Chamberlin, 1930

Type species
- Anagarypus oceanusindicus Chamberlin, 1930

Genus of pseudoscorpions

Anagarypus is a genus of pseudoscorpions in the Garypidae family. It was described in 1930 by American arachnologist Joseph Conrad Chamberlin. Species in the genus are found on islands along the coast of northern Australia and in the Indian Ocean.

== Species ==
As of October 2023, the World Pseudoscorpiones Catalog accepted the following species:

- Anagarypus australianus Muchmore, 1982
- Anagarypus heatwolei Muchmore, 1982
- Anagarypus oceanusindicus Chamberlin, 1930
