= Synsphyronus samueli =

Scientific classification
- Kingdom: Animalia
- Phylum: Arthropoda
- Subphylum: Chelicerata
- Class: Arachnida
- Order: Pseudoscorpiones
- Family: Garypidae
- Genus: Synsphyronus
- Species: S. samueli

Binomial name
- Synsphyronus samueli Cullen & Harvey, 2021

Species of pseudoscorpion

Synsphyronus samueli is a species of pseudoscorpion in the Garypidae family. It is endemic to Australia. It was described in 2021 by Australian arachnologists Karen Cullen and Mark Harvey. The specific epithet samueli honours the senior author’s son, Sam Cullen.

== Description ==
The body length of the male holotype is 3.38 mm. Colouration is generally reddish-brown with paired darker patches.

== Distribution and habitat ==
The species occurs in the Pilbara region of North West Australia. The type locality is the Cane River Conservation Park. The pseudoscorpions were found under rocks beneath a fig tree.

== Behaviour ==
The pseudoscorpions are terrestrial predators.
