= Synsphyronus inglisorum =

Scientific classification
- Kingdom: Animalia
- Phylum: Arthropoda
- Subphylum: Chelicerata
- Class: Arachnida
- Order: Pseudoscorpiones
- Family: Garypidae
- Genus: Synsphyronus
- Species: S. inglisorum

Binomial name
- Synsphyronus inglisorum Harvey, 2023

Species of pseudoscorpion

Synsphyronus inglisorum is a species of pseudoscorpion in the Garypidae family. It is endemic to Australia. It was described in 2023 by Australian arachnologist Mark Harvey. The specific epithet inglisorum honours the Inglis family, on whose property the specimens were collected, for their efforts in rehabilitating their land for conservation.

== Description ==
The body lengths of the male holotype is 2.77 mm; that of the female paratype is 3.12 mm. Colouration is generally dark reddish-brown.

== Distribution and habitat ==
The species occurs in the Sydney Basin bioregion of eastern New South Wales. The type locality is Craigend Farm, 5.8 km south-south-west of The Oaks, where the pseudoscorpions were found beneath the bark of a thin-leaved stringybark tree in remnant bushland.

== Behaviour ==
The pseudoscorpions are terrestrial predators.
