= Garypus necopinus =

Scientific classification
- Kingdom: Animalia
- Phylum: Arthropoda
- Subphylum: Chelicerata
- Class: Arachnida
- Order: Pseudoscorpiones
- Family: Garypidae
- Genus: Garypus
- Species: G. necopinus

Binomial name
- Garypus necopinus Harvey, 2020

Species of pseudoscorpion

Garypus necopinus is a species of pseudoscorpion in the Garypidae family. It was described in 2020 by Australian arachnologist Mark Harvey.

== Distribution and habitat ==
The species occurs in Far North Queensland. The type locality is Moa Island in Torres Strait, where the holotype was found in rotting logs on a sandy beach near high tide mark. Other specimens come from some northern islands of the Great Barrier Reef as well as from the Apudthama National Park at the northern end of the Cape York Peninsula.
