= Synsphyronus viridis =

Scientific classification
- Kingdom: Animalia
- Phylum: Arthropoda
- Subphylum: Chelicerata
- Class: Arachnida
- Order: Pseudoscorpiones
- Family: Garypidae
- Genus: Synsphyronus
- Species: S. viridis

Binomial name
- Synsphyronus viridis (Tubb, 1937)

Synonyms
- Maorigarypus viridis Tubb, 1937

Species of pseudoscorpion

Synsphyronus viridis is a species of pseudoscorpion in the Garypidae family. It is endemic to Australia. It was described in 1937 by Australian zoologist Alan Tubb.

== Distribution and habitat ==
The species occurs in Victoria. The type (and only known) locality is Lady Julia Percy Island in Bass Strait, where it was found beneath stones near Seal Bay.

== Behaviour ==
The pseudoscorpions are terrestrial predators.
