= Synsphyronus bounites =

Scientific classification
- Kingdom: Animalia
- Phylum: Arthropoda
- Subphylum: Chelicerata
- Class: Arachnida
- Order: Pseudoscorpiones
- Family: Garypidae
- Genus: Synsphyronus
- Species: S. bounites

Binomial name
- Synsphyronus bounites Harvey, 1987

Species of pseudoscorpion

Synsphyronus bounites is a species of pseudoscorpion in the Garypidae family. It is endemic to Australia. It was described in 1987 by Australian arachnologist Mark Harvey. The specific epithet bounites (Greek: 'dweller in the hills') refers to the montane localities of the two type specimens.

== Description ==
The body length of the holotype male is 3.4 mm; that of the female paratype is 3.7 mm. Colouration is reddish-brown.

== Distribution and habitat ==
The species occurs in south-eastern Australia. The type locality is Wilsons Valley, near Mount Kosciuszko in south-eastern New South Wales, where the holotype was found in plant litter and soil. A paratype was obtained from moss on the north-west side of Mount Pilot in north-eastern Victoria.

== Behaviour ==
The pseudoscorpions are terrestrial predators.
