= Synsphyronus codyi =

Scientific classification
- Kingdom: Animalia
- Phylum: Arthropoda
- Subphylum: Chelicerata
- Class: Arachnida
- Order: Pseudoscorpiones
- Family: Garypidae
- Genus: Synsphyronus
- Species: S. codyi

Binomial name
- Synsphyronus codyi Cullen & Harvey, 2021

Species of pseudoscorpion

Synsphyronus codyi is a species of pseudoscorpion in the Garypidae family. It is endemic to Australia. It was described in 2021 by Australian arachnologists Karen Cullen and Mark Harvey. The specific epithet codyi honours the senior author’s son, Cody Cullen.

== Description ==
The body lengths of females are 2.98–4.09 mm. Colouration is generally yellowish-brown.

== Distribution and habitat ==
The species occurs in the Pilbara region of North West Australia. The type locality is Cattle Pool in the Cane River Conservation Park, where the pseudoscorpions were found beneath the bark of a silver-leaved paperbark tree.

== Behaviour ==
The pseudoscorpions are terrestrial predators.
