= Protogarypinus dissimilis =

Scientific classification
- Kingdom: Animalia
- Phylum: Arthropoda
- Subphylum: Chelicerata
- Class: Arachnida
- Order: Pseudoscorpiones
- Family: Garypinidae
- Genus: Protogarypinus
- Species: P. dissimilis

Binomial name
- Protogarypinus dissimilis Beier, 1975

Species of pseudoscorpion

Protogarypinus dissimilis is a species of pseudoscorpion in the Garypinidae family. It is endemic to Australia. It was described in 1975 by Austrian arachnologist Max Beier.

== Distribution and habitat ==
The species occurs in South Australia. The type locality is Alligator Gorge in Mount Remarkable National Park, where the pseudoscorpions were found in plant litter.

== Behaviour ==
The pseudoscorpions are terrestrial predators.
