= Synsphyronus hadronennus =

Scientific classification
- Kingdom: Animalia
- Phylum: Arthropoda
- Subphylum: Chelicerata
- Class: Arachnida
- Order: Pseudoscorpiones
- Family: Garypidae
- Genus: Synsphyronus
- Species: S. hadronennus

Binomial name
- Synsphyronus hadronennus Harvey, 1987

Species of pseudoscorpion

Synsphyronus hadronennus is a species of pseudoscorpion in the Garypidae family. It is endemic to Australia. It was described in 1987 by Australian arachnologist Mark Harvey. The specific epithet hadronennus comes from the Greek hadros ('stout' or 'well-developed') and nennos ('uncle'), referring to the species’ apparently close relationship with its smaller relatives, S. paradoxus and S. heptatrichus.

== Description ==
The body length of males is 2.6–2.9 mm; that of females is 3.3–3.6 mm. Colouration is dark reddish-brown.

== Distribution and habitat ==
The species occurs in the Top End of the Northern Territory. The type locality is 6 km west of South Alligator, where the holotype was found beneath the bark of a eucalypt.

== Behaviour ==
The pseudoscorpions are terrestrial predators.
