= Synsphyronus tenuis =

Scientific classification
- Kingdom: Animalia
- Phylum: Arthropoda
- Subphylum: Chelicerata
- Class: Arachnida
- Order: Pseudoscorpiones
- Family: Garypidae
- Genus: Synsphyronus
- Species: S. tenuis

Binomial name
- Synsphyronus tenuis Harvey, 2022

Species of pseudoscorpion

Synsphyronus tenuis is a species of pseudoscorpion in the Garypidae family. It is endemic to Australia. It was described in 2022 by Australian arachnologist Mark Harvey. The specific epithet tenuis (Latin: 'thin') refers to the species’ extremely slender appendages.

== Description ==
Body lengths of males are 3.44–3.74 mm; those of females 3.66–4.29 mm. Colouration is generally yellowish-brown.

== Distribution and habitat ==
The species occurs in south-west Western Australia in the Geraldton Sandplains bioregion. The type locality is Kalbarri National Park, where the pseudoscorpions were found beneath sandstone rocks.

== Behaviour ==
The pseudoscorpions are terrestrial predators.
