= Synsphyronus silveirai =

Scientific classification
- Kingdom: Animalia
- Phylum: Arthropoda
- Subphylum: Chelicerata
- Class: Arachnida
- Order: Pseudoscorpiones
- Family: Garypidae
- Genus: Synsphyronus
- Species: S. silveirai

Binomial name
- Synsphyronus silveirai Harvey, 1987

Species of pseudoscorpion

Synsphyronus silveirai is a species of pseudoscorpion in the Garypidae family. It is endemic to Australia. It was described in 1987 by Australian arachnologist Mark Harvey. The specific epithet silveirai honours Charles Silveira who collected the first specimens.

== Description ==
Body lengths are 3.2–3.5 mm. Colouration is yellowish-brown.

== Distribution and habitat ==
The species occurs in northern New South Wales, just south of the border with Queensland. The type locality is 16 km south of Texas, where the pseudoscorpions were found beneath eucalypt bark.

== Behaviour ==
The pseudoscorpions are terrestrial predators.
