= Synsphyronus patricki =

Scientific classification
- Kingdom: Animalia
- Phylum: Arthropoda
- Subphylum: Chelicerata
- Class: Arachnida
- Order: Pseudoscorpiones
- Family: Garypidae
- Genus: Synsphyronus
- Species: S. patricki

Binomial name
- Synsphyronus patricki Cullen & Harvey, 2021

Species of pseudoscorpion

Synsphyronus patricki is a species of pseudoscorpion in the Garypidae family. It is endemic to Australia. It was described in 2021 by Australian arachnologists Karen Cullen and Mark Harvey. The specific epithet patricki honours Patrick Cullen, collector of the type specimens.

== Description ==
The body length of the male holotype is 2.90 mm; that of the female paratype is 3.76 mm. Colouration is generally reddish-brown.

== Distribution and habitat ==
The species occurs in the Carnarvon bioregion of North West Australia. The type locality is near Centipede Well on Giralia Bay Station. The pseudoscorpions were found beneath limestone rocks where the vegetation is dominated by Triodia and sparse Acacia spp.

== Behaviour ==
The pseudoscorpions are terrestrial predators.
