= Synsphyronus xynus =

Scientific classification
- Kingdom: Animalia
- Phylum: Arthropoda
- Subphylum: Chelicerata
- Class: Arachnida
- Order: Pseudoscorpiones
- Family: Garypidae
- Genus: Synsphyronus
- Species: S. xynus

Binomial name
- Synsphyronus xynus Cullen & Harvey, 2021

Species of pseudoscorpion

Synsphyronus xynus is a species of pseudoscorpion in the Garypidae family. It is endemic to Australia. It was described in 2021 by Australian arachnologists Karen Cullen and Mark Harvey. The specific epithet xynus ('common') refers to the species’ widespread distribution throughout the Pilbara region.

== Description ==
The body lengths of males are 2.14–2.69 mm; those of females 2.36–3.23 mm. Colouration is generally reddish-brown with paired darker patches.

== Distribution and habitat ==
The species occurs in the Pilbara region of North West Australia, where it is found beneath paperbark and eucalypt bark. The type locality is 20 km south-west of Hancock Gorge in Karijini National Park.

== Behaviour ==
The pseudoscorpions are terrestrial predators.
