= Solinus (arachnid) =

Scientific classification
- Kingdom: Animalia
- Phylum: Arthropoda
- Subphylum: Chelicerata
- Class: Arachnida
- Order: Pseudoscorpiones
- Family: Garypinidae
- Genus: Solinus; Chamberlin, 1930

Type species
- Garypinus corticolus Chamberlin, 1923

Genus of pseudoscorpions

Solinus is a genus of pseudoscorpions in the Garypinidae family. It was described in 1930 by American arachnologist Joseph Conrad Chamberlin.

== Species ==
The genus contains the following species:

- Solinus africanus Beier, 1967
- Solinus australiensis Chamberlin, 1930
- Solinus corticola (Chamberlin, 1923)
- Solinus cyrenaicus (Beier, 1929)
- Solinus hispanus Beier, 1939
- Solinus japonicus Morikawa, 1953
- Solinus minutus (Murthy and Ananthakrishnan, 1977)
- Solinus pingrup Harvey, 2023
- Solinus pusillus Beier, 1971
- Solinus rhodius Beier, 1966
