= Synsphyronus leo =

Scientific classification
- Kingdom: Animalia
- Phylum: Arthropoda
- Subphylum: Chelicerata
- Class: Arachnida
- Order: Pseudoscorpiones
- Family: Garypidae
- Genus: Synsphyronus
- Species: S. leo

Binomial name
- Synsphyronus leo Harvey, 1987

Species of pseudoscorpion

Synsphyronus leo is a species of pseudoscorpion in the Garypidae family. It is endemic to Australia. It was described in 1987 by Australian arachnologist Mark Harvey. The specific epithet leo (Latin: 'lion') refers both to the type locality and the relatively large size of the species.

== Description ==
Body lengths are 5.2–5.8 mm. Colouration is light yellowish-brown.

== Distribution and habitat ==
The species occurs in south-west Western Australia. The type locality is Lion Island, near Esperance in the Recherche Archipelago, where the pseudoscorpions were found beneath granite slabs.

== Behaviour ==
The pseudoscorpions are terrestrial predators.
