= Steinerne Rose =

Rock formation in Germany

Coordinates: 50°31′15″N 11°44′5″E

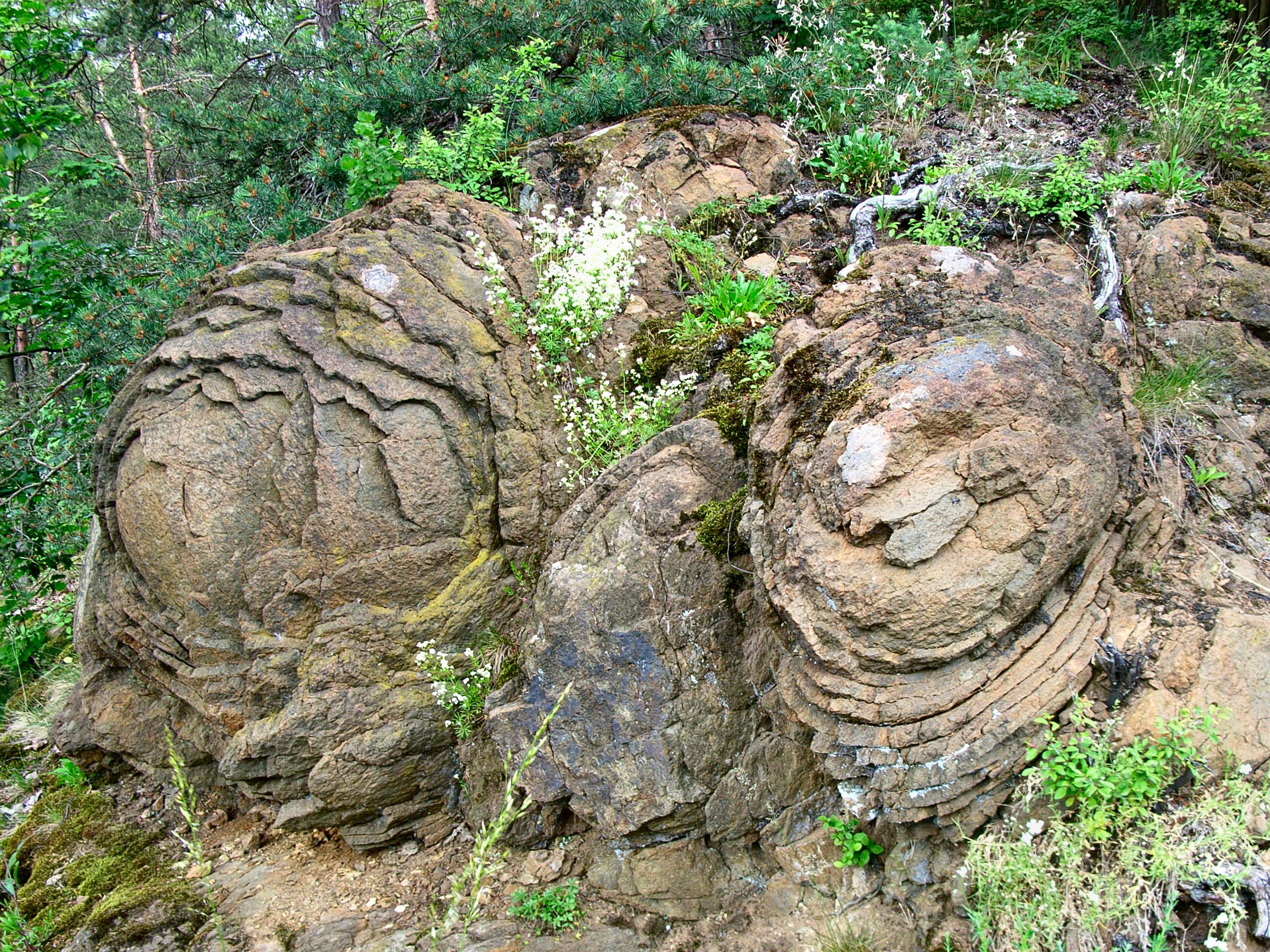
The Steinerne Rose

The Steinerne Rose is a rare natural monument. It is a diabase rock formation, that originated on the sea bed from outflowing lava in the middle Devonian, i.e. about 400 million years ago. The lava formed pillow-like bodies which have an internal structure of concentric layers. Over thousands, if not millions, of years these layers have been weathered out (exfoliation joints), giving the bodies the appearance of rosebuds in bloom.

The Steinerne Rose is located about 700 metres north of Kloster, a village in the borough of Saalburg-Ebersdorf in the district of Saale-Orla-Kreis in the central German state of Thuringia, on the local road known as the Reußische Fürstenstraße (L 1095), immediately on the right in front of the bridge over the old Schleiz–Saalburg railway.

There are several smaller stone roses on the Schlossfelsen rocks in Ronneburg.
