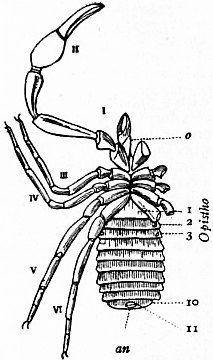
- Garypus beauvoisii

Scientific classification
- Domain: Eukaryota
- Kingdom: Animalia
- Phylum: Arthropoda
- Subphylum: Chelicerata
- Class: Arachnida
- Order: Pseudoscorpiones
- Family: Garypidae
- Genus: Garypus; L. Koch, 1873

= Garypus =

Genus of pseudoscorpions

Garypus is a genus of pseudoscorpions in the family Garypidae. It was described by German arachnologist Ludwig Carl Christian Koch in 1873. The species are found mainly in tropical and subtropical areas, where they occupy supralittoral and littoral zones in seashore habitats.

== Species ==
The genus contains the following species:

- Garypus armeniacus Redikorzev, 1926
- Garypus beauvoisii (Audouin, 1826)
- Garypus bonairensis Beier, 1936
- Garypus californicus Banks, 1909
- Garypus darsahensis Mahnert, 2007
- Garypus decolor Muchmore, 1991
- Garypus dissitus Harvey, 2020
- Garypus floridensis Banks, 1895
- Garypus giganteus Chamberlin, 1921
- Garypus gracilis V. F. Lee, 1979
- Garypus granosus Mahnert, 2014
- Garypus insularis Tullgren, 1907
- Garypus krusadiensis Murthy & Ananthakrishnan, 1977
- Garypus latens Harvey, 2020
- Garypus levantinus Navás, 1925
- Garypus longidigitus Hoff, 1947
- Garypus maldivensis Pocock, 1904
- Garypus malgaryungu Harvey, 2020
- Garypus marmoratus Mahnert, 1982
- Garypus necopinus Harvey, 2020
- Garypus nicobarensis Beier, 1930
- Garypus occultus Mahnert, 1982
- Garypus ornatus Beier, 1957
- Garypus pallidus Chamberlin, 1923
- Garypus postlei Harvey, 2020
- Garypus ranalliorum Harvey, 2020
- Garypus realini Wagenaar-Hummelinck, 1948
- Garypus reong Harvey, 2020
- Garypus sanasai Lin & Chang, 2022
- Garypus saxicola Waterhouse, 1878
  - Garypus saxicola salvagensis Helversen, 1965
  - Garypus saxicola saxicola Waterhouse, 1878
- Garypus schwendingeri Harvey, 2021
- Garypus sini Chamberlin, 1923
- Garypus titanius Beier, 1961
- Garypus viridans Banks, 1909
- Garypus weipa Harvey, 2020
- Garypus wilsoni Lin & Chang, 2022
- Garypus withi Hoff, 1946
- Garypus yeni Harvey, 2020
