= Anchigarypus =

Scientific classification
- Kingdom: Animalia
- Phylum: Arthropoda
- Subphylum: Chelicerata
- Class: Arachnida
- Order: Pseudoscorpiones
- Family: Garypidae
- Genus: Anchigarypus; Harvey, 2020

Genus of arachnids

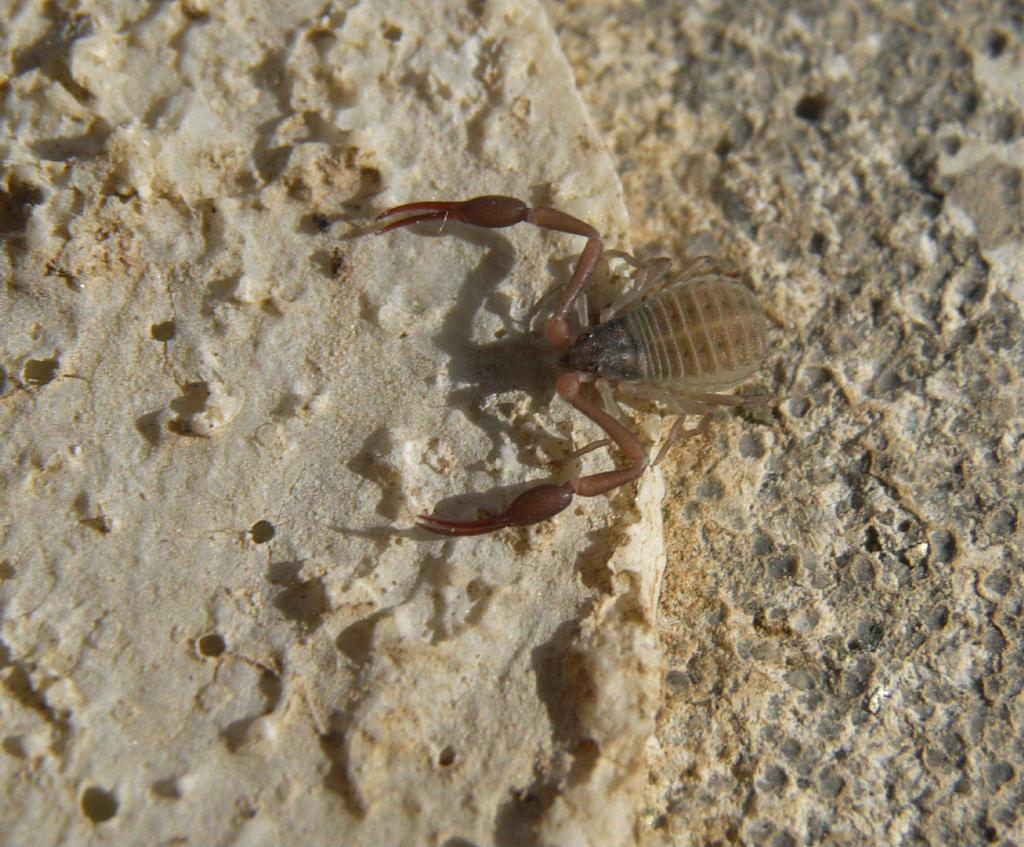

Anchigarypus is a genus of pseudoscorpions.

== Taxonomy ==
Anchigarypus contains the following species:

- Anchigarypus californicus
- Anchigarypus guadalupensis
- Anchigarypus japonicus
