= Pseudogarypinus =

Scientific classification
- Kingdom: Animalia
- Phylum: Arthropoda
- Subphylum: Chelicerata
- Class: Arachnida
- Order: Pseudoscorpiones
- Family: Garypinidae
- Genus: Pseudogarypinus; Beier, 1931

Genus of pseudoscorpions

Pseudogarypinus is a genus of pseudoscorpions in the Garypinidae family. It was described in 1931 by Austrian arachnologist Max Beier.

== Species ==
The genus contains the following species:

- Pseudogarypinus cooperi Muchmore, 1980
- Pseudogarypinus costaricensis Beier, 1931
- Pseudogarypinus frontalis (Banks, 1909)
- Pseudogarypinus giganteus Hoff, 1961
