= Exfoliation joint =

Type of weathering joint

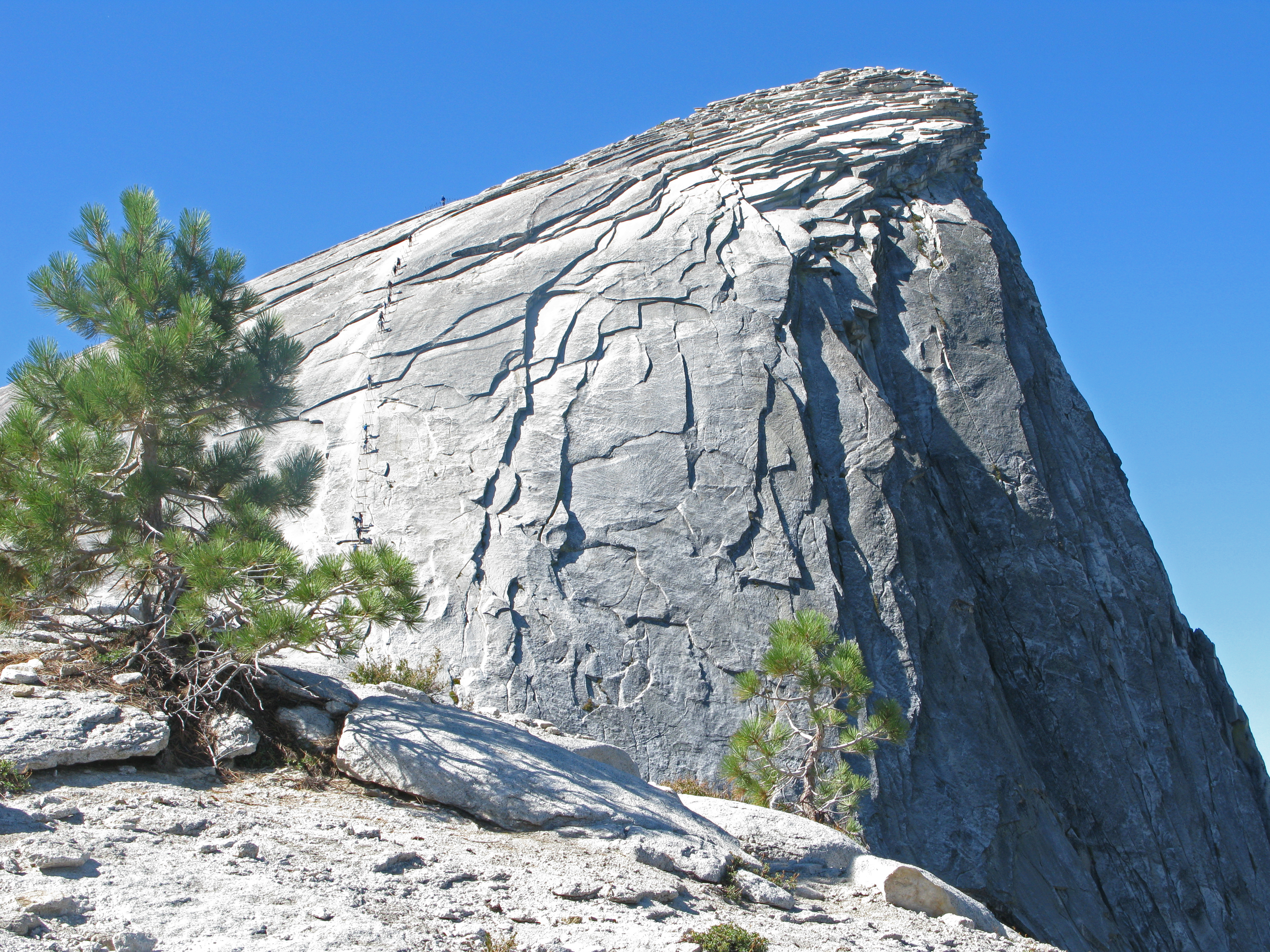
Exfoliation joints wrapping around Half Dome in Yosemite National Park, California

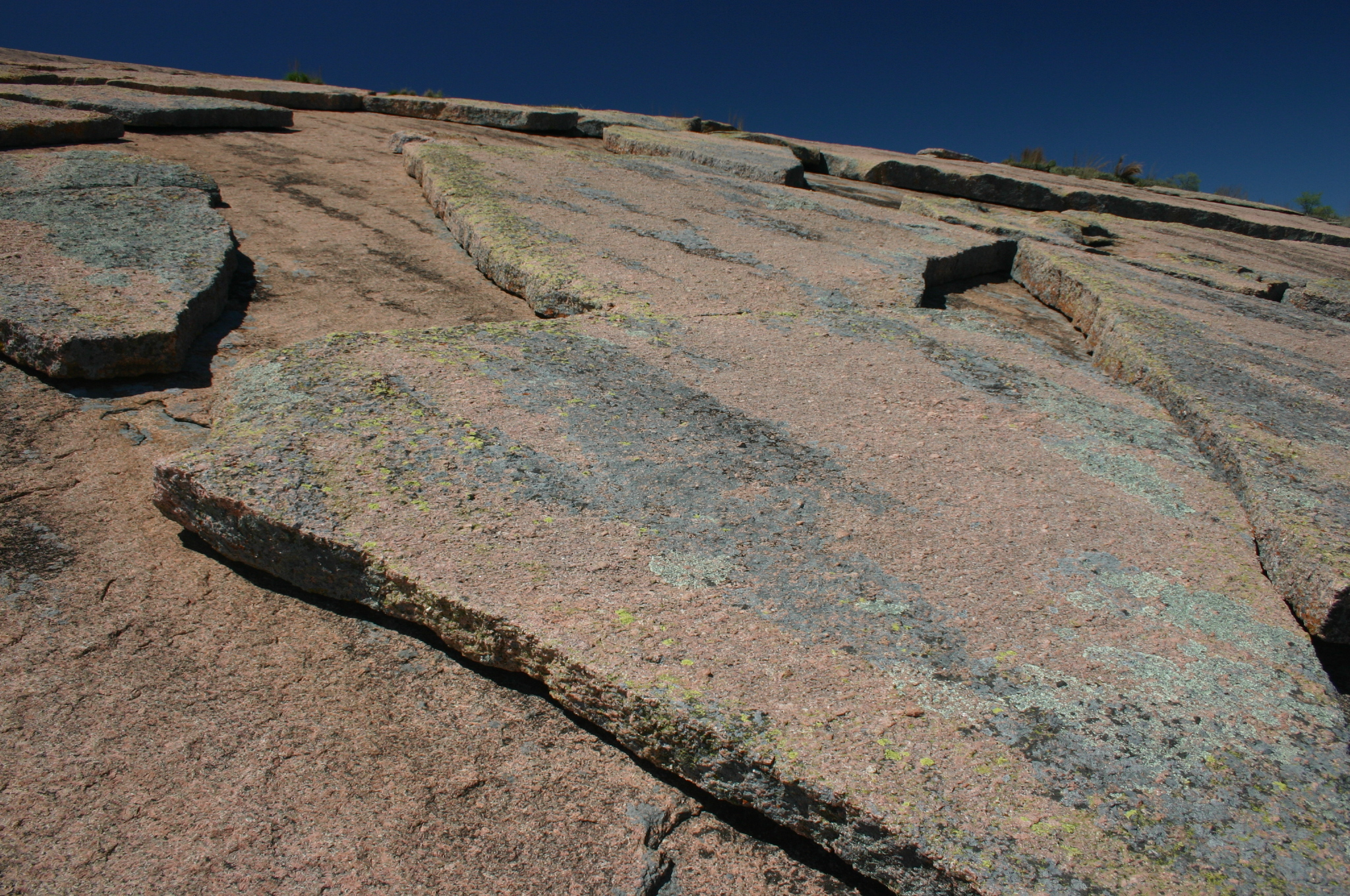
Exfoliation joints in granite at Enchanted Rock State Natural Area, Texas, US. Detached blocks have slid along the steeply-dipping joint plane.

Exfoliation joints or sheet joints are surface-parallel fracture systems in rock, often leading to the erosion of concentric slabs.

== General characteristics ==
- Commonly follow topography.
- Divide the rock into sub-planar slabs.
- Joint spacing increases with depth from a few centimeters near the surface to a few meters
- Maximum depth of observed occurrence is around 100 meters.
- Deeper joints have a larger radius of curvature, which tends to round the corners of the landscape as material is eroded
- Fracture mode is tensile
- Occur in many different lithologies and climate zones, not unique to glaciated landscapes.
- Host rock is generally sparsely jointed, fairly isotropic, and has high compressive strength.
- Can have concave and convex upwards curvatures.
- Often associated with secondary compressive forms such as arching, buckling, and A-tents (buckled slabs)

== Formation ==
Despite their common occurrence in many different landscapes, geologists have yet to reach an agreement on a general theory of exfoliation joint formation. Many different theories have been suggested, below is a short overview of the most common.

=== Removal of overburden and rebound ===
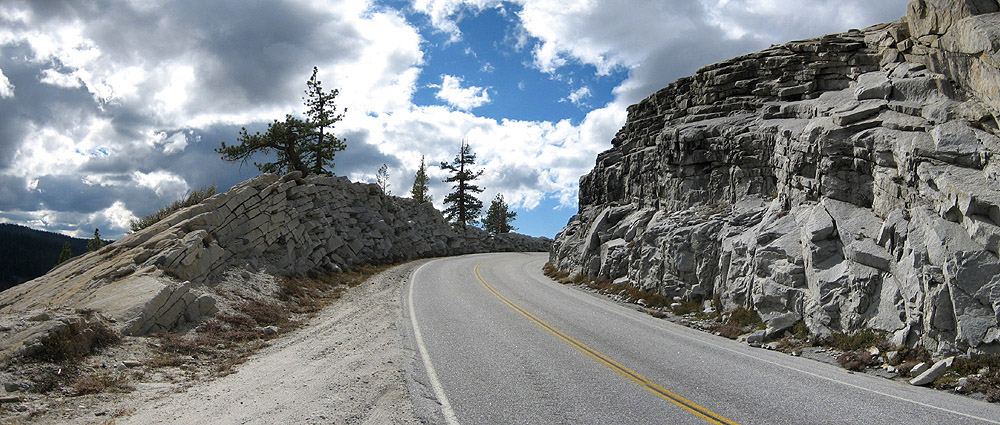
Exfoliation joints exposed in a road cut in Yosemite National Park, California

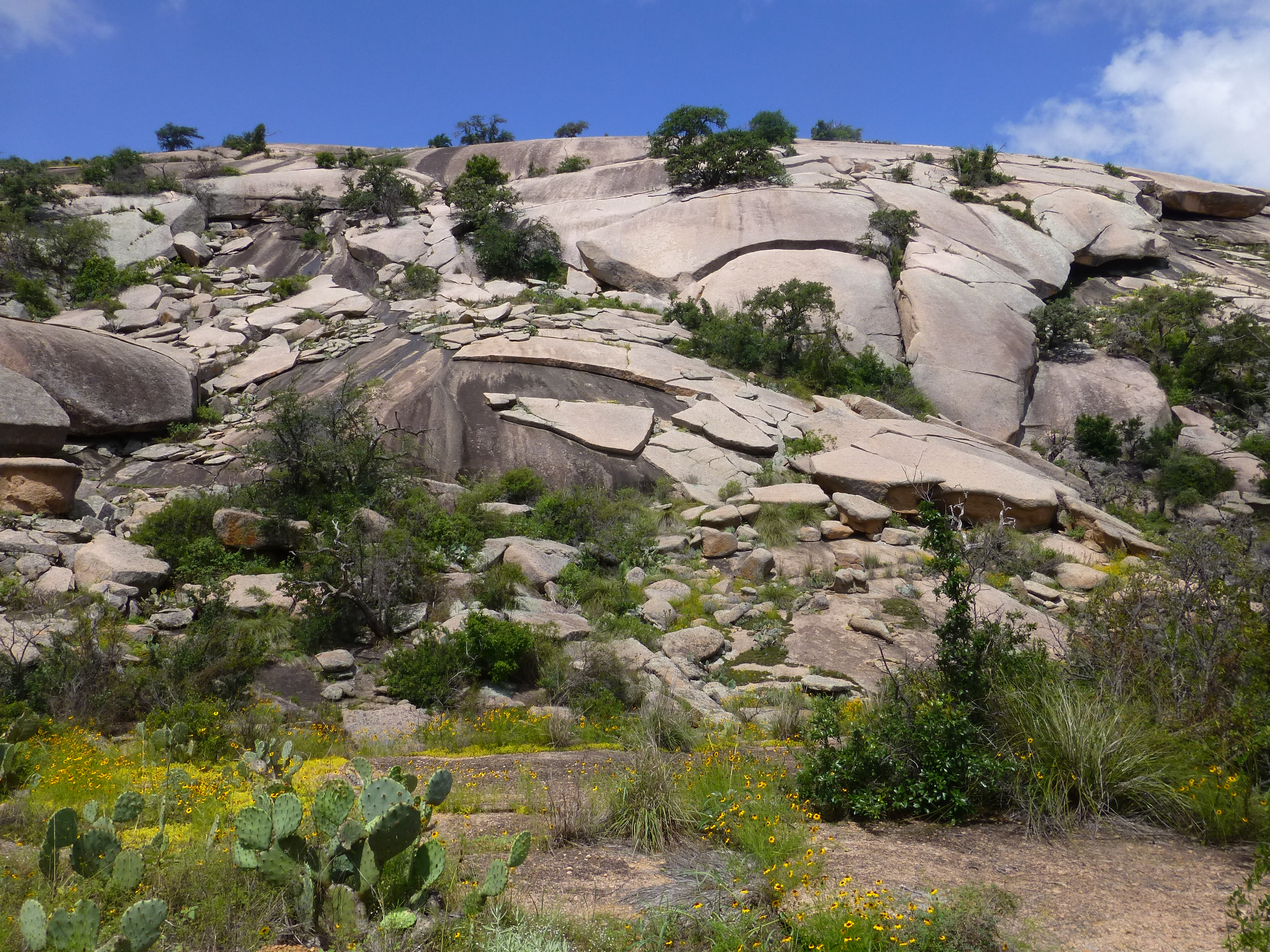
Exfoliation of granite at Enchanted Rock State Natural Area, Texas, USA

This theory was originally proposed by the pioneering geomorphologist Grove Karl Gilbert in 1904. The basis of this theory is that erosion of overburden and exhumation of deeply buried rock to the ground surface allows previously compressed rock to expand radially, creating tensile stress and fracturing the rock in layers parallel to the ground surface. The description of this mechanism has led to alternate terms for exfoliation joints, including pressure release or offloading joints. Though the logic of this theory is appealing, there are many inconsistencies with field and laboratory observations suggesting that it may be incomplete, such as:

- Exfoliation joints can be found in rocks that have never been deeply buried.
- Laboratory studies show that simple compression and relaxation of rock samples under realistic conditions does not cause fracturing.
- Exfoliation joints are most commonly found in regions of surface-parallel compressive stress, whereas this theory calls for them to occur in zones of extension.

One possible extension of this theory to match with the compressive stress theory (outlined below) is as follows (Goodman, 1989): The exhumation of deeply buried rocks relieves vertical stress, but horizontal stresses can remain in a competent rock mass since the medium is laterally confined. Horizontal stresses become aligned with the current ground surface as the vertical stress drops to zero at this boundary. Thus large surface-parallel compressive stresses can be generated through exhumation that may lead to tensile rock fracture as described below.

=== Thermoelastic strain ===
Rock expands upon heating and contracts upon cooling and different rock-forming minerals have variable rates of thermal expansion / contraction. Daily rock surface temperature variations can be quite large, and many have suggested that stresses created during heating cause the near-surface zone of rock to expand and detach in thin slabs (e.g. Wolters, 1969). Large diurnal or fire-induced temperature fluctuations have been observed to create thin lamination and flaking at the surface of rocks, sometimes labeled exfoliation. However, since diurnal temperature fluctuations only reach a few centimeters depth in rock (due to rock's low thermal conductivity), this theory cannot account for the observed depth of exfoliation jointing that may reach 100 meters.

=== Chemical weathering ===
Mineral weathering by penetrating water can cause flaking of thin shells of rock since the volume of some minerals increases upon hydration. However, not all mineral hydration results in increased volume, while field observations of exfoliation joints show that the joint surfaces have not experienced significant chemical alteration, so this theory can be rejected as an explanation for the origin of large-scale, deeper exfoliation joints.

=== Compressive stress and extensional fracture ===
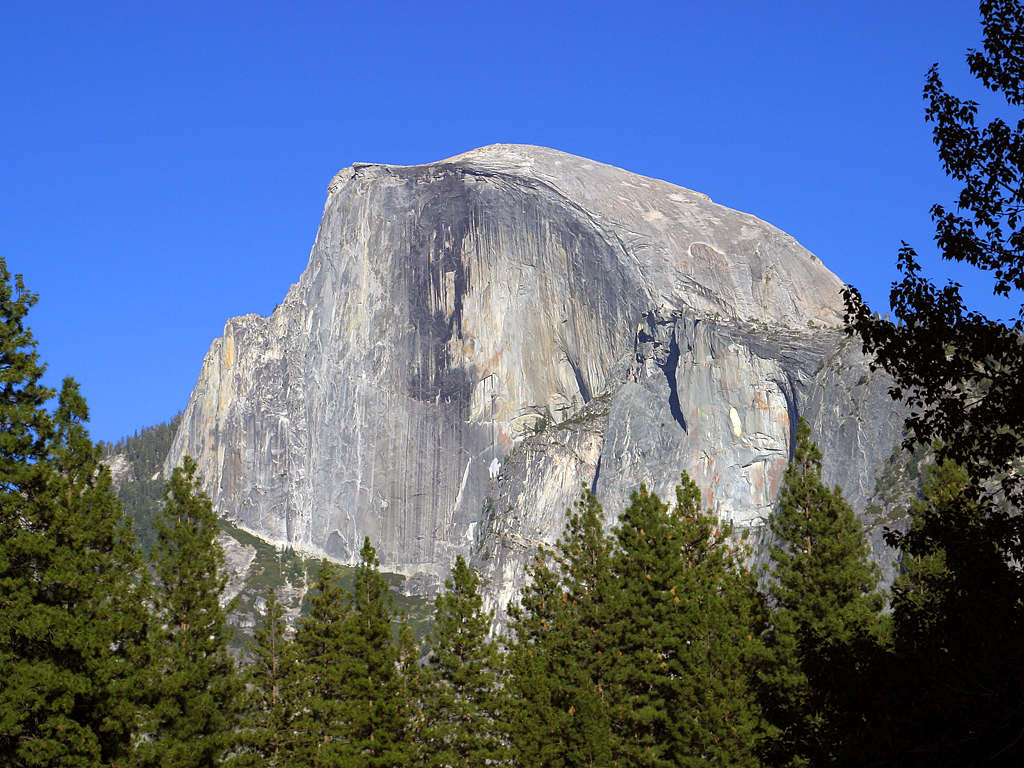
Exfoliation joints have modified the near-surface portions of massive granitic rocks in Yosemite National Park, helping create the many spectacular domes, including Half Dome shown here.

Large compressive tectonic stresses parallel to the land (or a free) surface can create tensile mode fractures in rock, where the direction of fracture propagation is parallel to the greatest principle compressive stress and the direction of fracture opening is perpendicular to the free surface. This type of fracturing has been observed in the laboratory since at least 1900 (in both uniaxial and biaxial unconfined compressive loading; see Gramberg, 1989). Tensile cracks can form in a compressive stress field due to the influence of pervasive microcracks in the rock lattice and extension of so-called wing cracks from near the tips of preferentially oriented microcracks, which then curve and align with the direction of the principle compressive stress. Fractures formed in this way are sometimes called axial cleavage, longitudinal splitting, or extensional fractures, and are commonly observed in the laboratory during uniaxial compression tests. High horizontal or surface-parallel compressive stress can result from regional tectonic or topographic stresses, or by erosion or excavation of overburden.

With consideration of the field evidence and observations of occurrence, fracture mode, and secondary forms, high surface-parallel compressive stresses and extensional fracturing (axial cleavage) seems to be the most plausible theory explaining the formation of exfoliation joints.

== Engineering geology significance ==
Recognizing the presence of exfoliation joints can have important implications in geological engineering. Most notable may be their influence on slope stability. Exfoliation joints following the topography of inclined valley walls, bedrock hill slopes, and cliffs can create rock blocks that are particularly prone to sliding. Especially when the toe of the slope is undercut (naturally or by human activity), sliding along exfoliation joint planes is likely if the joint dip exceeds the joint's frictional angle. Foundation work may also be affected by the presence of exfoliation joints, for example in the case of dams. Exfoliation joints underlying a dam foundation can create a significant leakage hazard, while increased water pressure in joints may result in lifting or sliding of the dam. Finally, exfoliation joints can exert strong directional control on groundwater flow and contaminant transport.

== See also ==
- Exfoliating granite
- Steinerne Rose, example of a natural rock monument caused by exfoliation.
