= Protogarypinus =

Scientific classification
- Kingdom: Animalia
- Phylum: Arthropoda
- Subphylum: Chelicerata
- Class: Arachnida
- Order: Pseudoscorpiones
- Family: Garypinidae
- Genus: Protogarypinus; Beier, 1954

Type species
- Protogarypinus giganteus Beier, 1954

Genus of pseudoscorpions

Protogarypinus is a genus of pseudoscorpions in the Garypinidae family. It is endemic to Australia. It was described in 1954 by Austrian arachnologist Max Beier.

== Species ==
The genus contains the following species:

- Protogarypinus dissimilis Beier, 1975
- Protogarypinus giganteus Beier, 1954
