= Synsphyronus absitus =

Scientific classification
- Kingdom: Animalia
- Phylum: Arthropoda
- Subphylum: Chelicerata
- Class: Arachnida
- Order: Pseudoscorpiones
- Family: Garypidae
- Genus: Synsphyronus
- Species: S. absitus

Binomial name
- Synsphyronus absitus Harvey, 1987

Species of pseudoscorpion

Synsphyronus absitus is a species of pseudoscorpion in the Garypidae family. It is endemic to Australia. It was described in 1987 by Australian arachnologist Mark Harvey. The specific epithet absitus (Latin: 'distant', 'apart' or 'remote') refers to its widespread distribution.

== Description ==
The body length of males is 3.2–3.9 mm; that of females 3.3–4.9 mm. Colouration is yellow-brown.

== Distribution and habitat ==
The species occurs in the Northern Territory, Queensland, South Australia and Western Australia. The type locality is Mundibarcooloo Waterhole, on Strzelecki Creek in the Lake Eyre basin, some 125 km south-south-west of Innamincka. The holotype was found beneath the bark of a coolabah tree.

== Behaviour ==
The pseudoscorpions are terrestrial predators.
