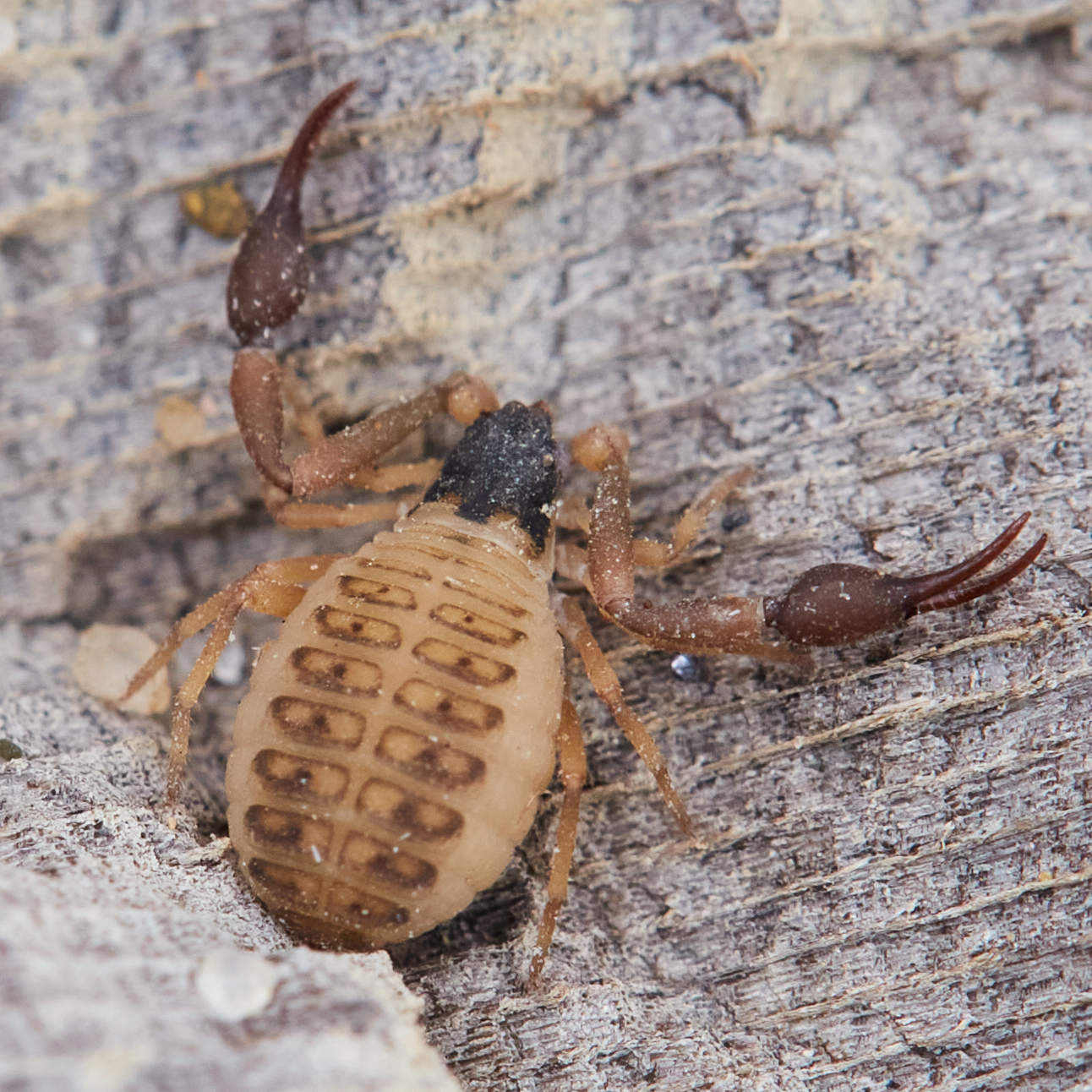

Scientific classification
- Domain: Eukaryota
- Kingdom: Animalia
- Phylum: Arthropoda
- Subphylum: Chelicerata
- Class: Arachnida
- Order: Pseudoscorpiones
- Family: Garypidae
- Genus: Garypus
- Species: G. californicus

Binomial name
- Garypus californicus Banks, 1909

= Garypus californicus =

Species of pseudoscorpion

Garypus californicus is a species of pseudoscorpion in the family Garypidae.
