= Oreolpium =

Scientific classification
- Kingdom: Animalia
- Phylum: Arthropoda
- Subphylum: Chelicerata
- Class: Arachnida
- Order: Pseudoscorpiones
- Family: Garypinidae
- Genus: Oreolpium; Benedict & Malcolm, 1978

Type species
- Oreolpium nymphum Benedict & Malcolm, 1978

Genus of pseudoscorpions

Oreolpium is a genus of pseudoscorpions in the Garypinidae family. It was described in 1978 by American arachnologists Ellen Benedict and David Malcolm.

== Species ==
The genus contains the following species:

- Oreolpium nymphum Benedict and Malcolm, 1978
- Oreolpium semotum Harvey and Šťáhlavský, 2010
