= Nymph Island National Park =

Australian island

- IUCN category II (national park)
- Location within Queensland
- Location: Queensland
- Coordinates: 14°39′20″S 145°15′03″E
- Area: 0.65 km^{2} (0.25 sq mi)
- Established: 1980
- Governing body: Queensland Parks and Wildlife Service

Nymph Island is within the Turtle Group national park in Far North Queensland, Australia, 1,636 km northwest of Brisbane. It is circular, with a lagoon in the centre. The island is only about a kilometre in diameter. No point on the island appears to exceed 30 metres (about 100 feet) in elevation.

== See also ==
- Protected areas of Queensland
