= Charles Darwin Reserve =

Nature reserve in Western Australia

Coordinates: 29.582°S 116.964°E

Charles Darwin Reserve is a nature reserve in the north east of the wheatbelt region of Western Australia.

== Description ==
It is 90 km from Wubin and 355 km north of Perth. It lies largely within the Southwestern Botanical Province on the northern edge of the Wheatbelt, with northern parts of the reserve extending into the Eremean Province, and is owned and managed by Bush Heritage Australia (BHA), by which it was purchased and renamed in 2003. The purchase of the reserve was partly funded by a donation by Charles Darwin's great-great-grandson Chris Darwin. The reserve occupies an area of 67,975 hectares (262 sq mi) and was formerly part of the pastoral lease, Whitewells Station.

== Natural values ==
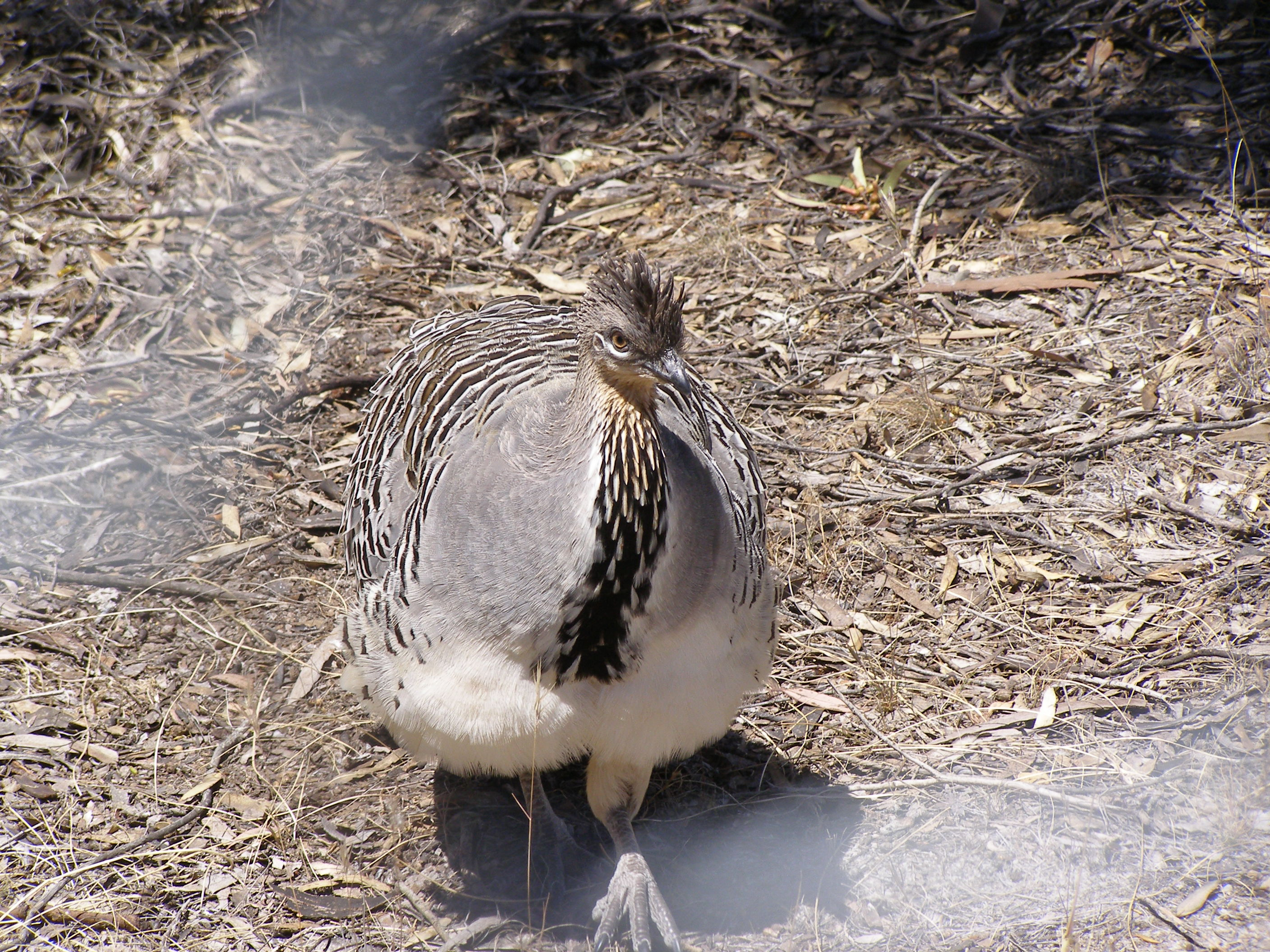
The importance of the reserve for malleefowl conservation is one reason it was designated an IBA; this image is from the Yongergnow Malleefowl Centre at Ongerup, Western Australia.

The reserve has a semi-arid Mediterranean climate with an annual average, mainly winter, rainfall of 282 mm. It protects York gum and salmon gum woodlands as well as heath and sand-plains. The old-growth woodlands contain tree-hollows suitable for many animals. Birds recorded on the reserve include malleefowl, Australian bustards, Major Mitchell's cockatoos, peregrine falcons, crested bellbirds, and the Wheatbelt form of the white-browed babbler. Mammals include short-beaked echidnas, euros and red kangaroos.

=== Important Bird Area ===
The reserve, along with the neighbouring Mount Gibson Sanctuary, forms part of the 2335 km^{2} Mount Gibson and Charles Darwin Important Bird Area (IBA), so identified by BirdLife International principally because it supports populations of malleefowl and western corellas, as well as several other species restricted to either the arid or mallee biomes.
