= Chris Darwin =

English environmentalist and conservationist

- Born: 16 March 1961 (age 65); London, UK
- Occupations: Environmentalist; Nature conservationist
- Family: Darwin–Wedgwood family

Christopher William Darwin (born 16 March 1961) is an environmentalist and nature conservationist who lives in Australia and works on his goal of halting the global mass extinction of species. He is the ambassador of the charity Bush Heritage Australia. He is the great-great-grandson of Charles Darwin.

== Biography ==
Darwin was born in 1961 in London. He is the son of George Erasmus Darwin, a metallurgist, known as "Erasmus", and his wife Shuna (née Service). He has an older brother Robert George Darwin and a younger sister, Sarah Darwin Vogel, an evolutionary biologist. He is descended from Charles Darwin via Charles's son George Howard Darwin (1845-1912) an astronomer, his son William Robert Darwin (1894-1970), a stockbroker and brother of the physicist Charles Galton Darwin, and his wife Sarah Monica (née Slingsby) were the parents of George Erasmus Darwin (1927-2017).

Ironically, given his famous ancestor, Darwin struggled with biology in his school years, failing the biology A-level. He later graduated from Oxford Polytechnic (latterly Oxford Brookes University) with a Bachelor of Science degree in Psychology and Geography. In 1983 he started London’s first bicycle rickshaw taxi service, and in 1984 was official photographer and assistant organiser for the first Round Britain Windsurf Expedition. The book Round Britain Windsurf by Tim Batstone, features Darwin's photographs. He worked in advertising and television commercial production in the United Kingdom before emigrating to Australia in 1986.

In 1991, he co-authored (with John Amy) the book The Social Climbers. In 1995, he co-edited (also with John Amy), The Ultimate Australian Adventure Guide. Darwin is married to Jacqui and has three children, Ali, Erasmus (Ras), and Monty. They live in the Blue Mountains west of Sydney, New South Wales, where Chris works in nature conservation.

== Charitable work ==
Darwin co-authored (with John Amy) the book The Social Climbers. Written about a 1989 event in which Darwin and a group of seven other friends held a dinner party on top of Mount Huascaran in Peru, the book raised money for the National Heart Foundation. The dinner party itself set a world record for the "highest formal dinner party on Earth."

In 2003, Darwin made a donation to the Bush Heritage Australia charity to help purchase the Charles Darwin Reserve in Western Australia. The 65,000 hectare reserve is intended to preserve plant species.

In 2009 he became an ambassador for Bush Heritage Australia.

== Public appearances and opinions ==
In 2005 Chris, along with other descendants of Charles Darwin, including his father, sister, and various cousins, were involved in counting the flowers at Down House. He was also the guest of honour at a dinner celebrating the Darwin bicentenary at Melbourne Museum.

Darwin believes that teaching children creationism is acceptable, despite his own lack of religious faith. He believes that it is "important that children think through what is told to them and come to their own conclusions."

== See also ==
- Darwin–Wedgwood family
