= C. Clayton Hoff =

Clarence Clayton Hoff (July 6, 1908, Fortuna, North Dakota – April 27, 1983, Rock Island, Illinois) was an American zoologist. He first studied at Quincy College, Quincy, Illinois, before transferring to the University of New Mexico, Albuquerque. His early work was on ostracods, but he quickly turned to pseudoscorpions where he described numerous new species and genera, principally from North America.
