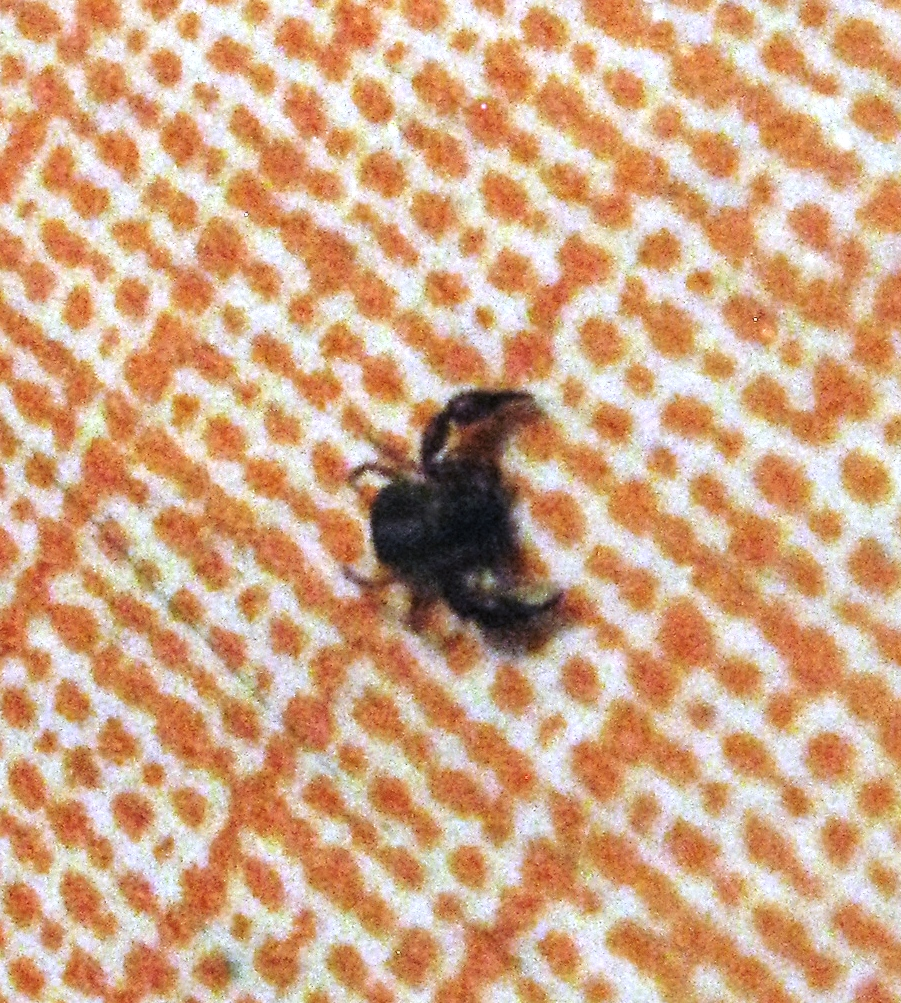
- Serianus bolivianus

Scientific classification
- Kingdom: Animalia
- Phylum: Arthropoda
- Subphylum: Chelicerata
- Class: Arachnida
- Order: Pseudoscorpiones
- Family: Garypinidae; Daday, 1889

= Garypinidae =

Garypinidae Temporal range: Cretaceous–present

Family of pseudoscorpions

Garypinidae is a family of pseudoscorpions, first described by Eugen von Daday in 1889.

== Genera ==
As of October 2023, the World Pseudoscorpiones Catalog accepted the following twenty-one genera:

- Aldabrinus Chamberlin, 1930
- Amblyolpium Simon, 1898
- Caecogarypinus Dashdamirov, 2007
- Galapagodinus Beier, 1978
- Garypinidius Beier, 1955
- Garypinus Daday, 1889
- Haplogarypinus Beier, 1959
- Hemisolinus Beier, 1977
- Nelsoninus Beier, 1967
- Neoamblyolpium Hoff, 1956
- Neominniza Beier, 1930
- Nobilipinus Harvey, 2023
- Oreolpium Benedict & Malcolm, 1978
- Protogarypinus Beier, 1954
- Pseudogarypinus Beier, 1931
- Serianus Chamberlin, 1930
- Solinellus Muchmore, 1979
- Solinus Chamberlin, 1930
- Teratolpium Beier, 1959
- Thaumatolpium Beier, 1931
- †Ajkagarypinus Novák, Harvey, Márton, Hammel, Harms, Kotthoff, Hörweg, Brazidec & Ősi, 2023
