= Exfoliating granite =

Granite spalling in superficial layers due to temperature cycles

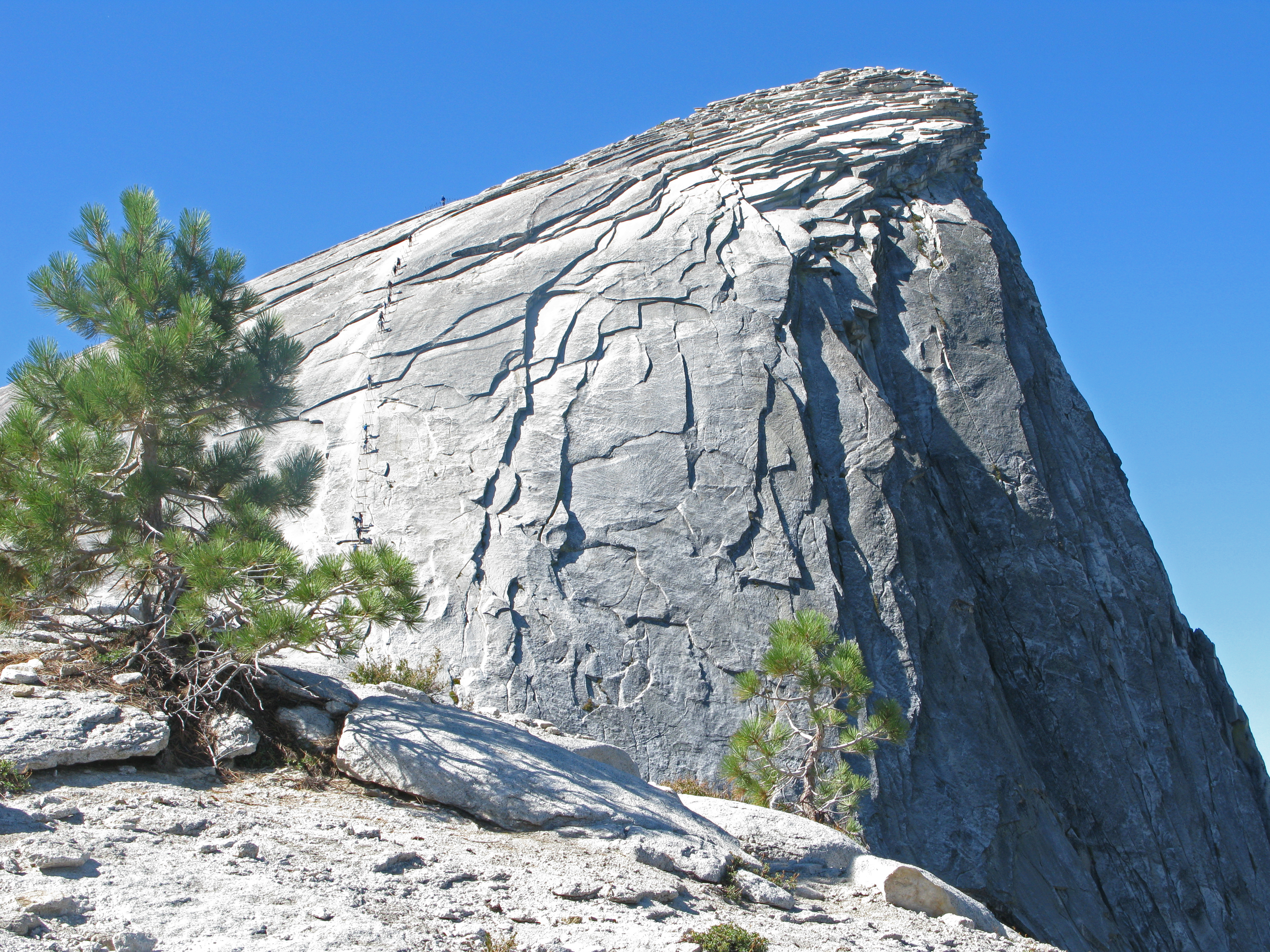
Exfoliating slabs of granite, on Half Dome in Yosemite National Park, USA

Exfoliating granite is a granite undergoing exfoliation, or onion skin weathering (desquamation). The external delaminated layers of granite are gradually produced by the cyclic variations of temperature at the surface of the rock in a process also called spalling. Frost and ice expansion in the joints during the winter accelerate the alteration process while the most unstable loose external layers are removed by gravity assisted by surface runoff of water.

== Geology ==
Homogeneous granitic plutons are created in high-pressure environments and slowly solidify beneath the Earth's crust. Vertical compression of overburden releases through erosion, or removal of overlying rocks resulting in unloading. Other contributors of unloading are tectonic uplift, glacier retreat, and mass wasting. The pressure is relieved when the granite is exposed at the surface, allowing it to expand towards the atmosphere.

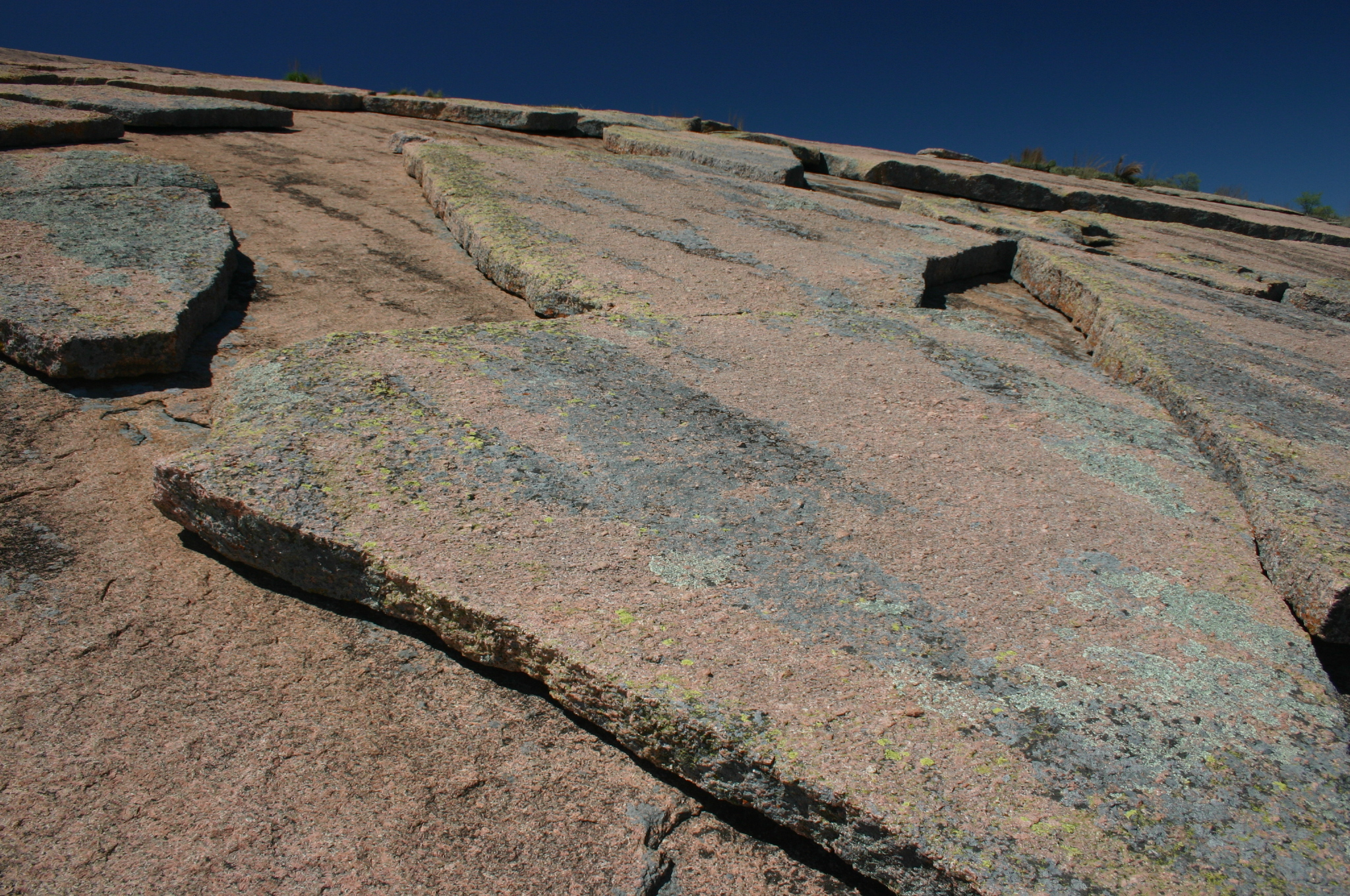
Exfoliating granite, at Enchanted Rock State Natural Area, Texas

On the surface, if the granite is not jointed, or if it has few joints, then the exposed surface usually expands faster than the underlying granite. The surface layer, often a couple hundred feet (about 60 m or so) thick, separates from the underlying granite along an expansion joint to form a shell. As this continues, several concentric shells may form to depths of 100 feet (30 m) or more. Concentric shells or layered slabs of rock begin to break loose, onion-like layers subparallel to the exterior called exfoliation joints, sheet jointing, or fractures. As the granite expands the outermost shells may be further widened by processes of physical weathering: water pressure, freeze—thaw cycles, and the effects of vegetation. The sheets of granite are large enough to shave off sharp edges on the granite's surface creating a dome shape. The overall activity creates exfoliation domes.

Chemical weathering occurs in granite exfoliation by changing the mineral composition. Mechanical weathering is the breakdown of rocks into smaller fragments or pieces.

== Dangers ==
=== Rock falls ===
Exfoliating rock can trigger rockfall. Rock Falls in Yosemite National Park are common and pose a threat to visitors. United States Geological Survey (USGS) conducted a study over a three-year period, monitoring granite cracks within the park's Valley. Data was collected by Park Geologist Greg Stock, and USGS civil engineer Brian Collins using deformation and temperature gauges. They concluded that there is an outward expansion of up to an inch, with a change in thermal temperature. With prolonged movement, the cracks expand over time and create exfoliation.

=== Infrastructure failure ===
Twain Harte Dam is in Tuolumne County, California, within the Sierra Nevada mountain range. The structure, completed in 1928, is between two granite domes. In August 2014, the granite developed exfoliating joints and began to leak. The process was captured on video, one of only a few ever to be caught on film. The lake was completely drained; the cost of reconstruction works was US$900,000. In June 2016, the granite dome known as "the Rock" was closed off for a second time as a safety precaution because of continued exfoliation.

== See also ==
=== Examples ===
- Cannon Mountain (New Hampshire) in the White Mountains
- Enchanted Rock, Texas
- Geography of the Yosemite area
  - Half Dome, Yosemite
  - Royal Arches in Yosemite National Park

=== Processes ===
- Discontinuity (geotechnical engineering) – Surface dividing a soil or rock mass by differing properties
- Erosion surface – Natural surface created by rock erosion
- Foliation (geology) – Repetitive layering in metamorphic rocks
- Spheroidal weathering – Form of chemical weathering that affects jointed bedrock
- Adelson, Mitch; Seelig, Willliam (27 October 2016). Rockfalls in California's Sierra Nevada (Lecture). U.S. Geological Survey. [PubTalk 10/2016].
- Collins, Brian D.; Stock, Greg M.; Eppes, Martha-Cary; Lewis, Scott W.; Corbett, Skye C.; Smith, Joel B. (22 February 2018). "Thermal influences on spontaneous rock dome exfoliation". Nature Communications. 9 (1). doi:10.1038/s41467-017-02728-1. PMC 5823905.
