= Joseph Conrad Chamberlin =

- Born: December 23, 1898; Salt Lake City
- Died: July 17, 1962 (aged 63); Hillsboro, Oregon
- Education: Stanford University
- Known for: Pseudoscorpion taxonomy
- Scientific career
- Fields: Arachnology
- Workplaces: United States Department of Agriculture

Joseph Conrad Chamberlin (December 23, 1898 – July 17, 1962) was an American arachnologist who studied mainly pseudoscorpions. A native of Utah, he studied primarily at Stanford University while working most of his career in Oregon for the U.S. Department of Agriculture. Several species are named in his honor.

His zoological author abbreviation is J.C.Chamberlin.

== Early life ==
Chamberlin was born in Salt Lake City, Utah to Ole Chamberlin and Mary Ethel (Conrad) Chamberlin. His parents were descended from early Mormon pioneer families, and he was their first child. Joseph's father died in 1911, leaving the remaining five person family near poverty. After one year of high school, he left school in 1914 to work in order to support the family. In October 1918, Joseph was drafted into the United States Army, but fell ill with the Spanish flu pandemic and never served in World War I.

After recovering, Chamberlin began college at the University of Utah when Congress allocated funding for veterans. Originally a one-year program, Congress expanded it to cover four years of school and Chamberlin transferred to Stanford University upon the recommendation of his uncle, Ralph Vary Chamberlin. He was accepted as a special case, and studied entomology in the Zoology Department. His tutor at Stanford was Gordon Floyd Ferris, an internationally reputed entomologist at the time. Chamberlin graduated in 1923 with a BA degree, and in 1924 with a master's degree.

== Career ==
Chamberlin began teaching after college at San Jose State University before earning a PhD from Stanford in 1929. That year, he began working for the United States Department of Agriculture. His first assignment with the department was in Idaho, where he worked until transferring to Modesto, California, in 1935. In 1936, he moved to Oregon, where he worked at a field station in Corvallis. In 1939, Chamberlin transferred to the Forest Grove station where he remained until 1961. He died in Hillsboro, Oregon.

Two genus-group names and eleven species have been named after him. He would describe several species while working with his uncle. Joseph married Clara Hya Gladstone in 1923 and they had 5 children. They divorced and he remarried Charlotte May in 1944, 6 years after his divorce.

== Eponymous taxa ==
=== Pseudoscorpions ===
The following pseudoscorpion taxa (species, genera, or subgenera) have been named for Chamberlin.

- Apocheiridium chamberlini Godfrey 1927
- Fissilicreagris chamberlini (Beier 1931)
- Afrosternophorus chamberlini (Redikorzev 1938)
- Haploditha chamberlinorum Caporiacco 1951*
- Kleptochthonius (Chamberlinochthonius) Vachon 1952
- Pararoncus chamberlini (Morikawa 1957)
- Larca chamberlini Benedict & Malcolm 1978
- Cheiridium chamberlini Dumitresco & Orghidan 1981
- Chthonius chamberlini (Leclerc 1983)
- Chamberlinarius Heurtault 1990
- Hya chamberlini Harvey 1993
- Tyrannochthonius chamberlini Muchmore 1996
- Anysrius chamberlini Harvey 1998
- Rhopalochernes chamberlini Heurtault 1998

*Named for J. Chamberlin and R.V. Chamberlin

=== Other taxa ===
Besides pseudoscorpions, other taxa named for Chamberlin include:

- Bulimulus chamberlini Hanna (Gastropoda)
- Centrioptera chamberlini Blaisdell (Tenebrionidae)
- Euagrus josephus R.V. Chamberlin (Araneae, Dipluridae)
- Euphorbia chamberlini I.M.Johnston (Euphorbia)
- Ticida chamberlini Van Duzee (Hemiptera, Dictyopharidae)
- Triphora chamberlini F. Baker, 1926 (Gastropoda, Triphoridae)

== See also ==
- William Henry Chamberlin (philosopher) - another uncle, brother of Ralph
