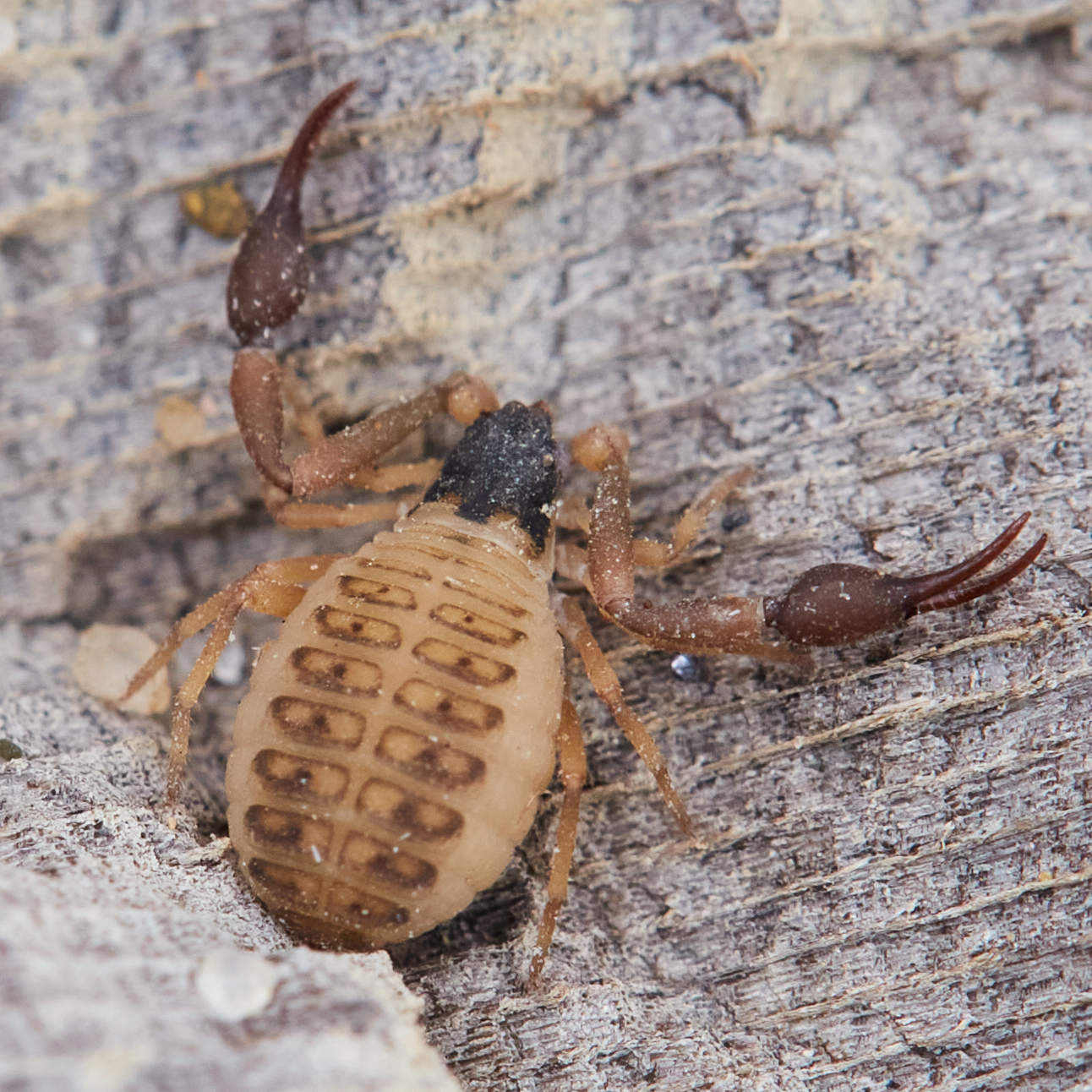
- Garypus californicus

Scientific classification
- Domain: Eukaryota
- Kingdom: Animalia
- Phylum: Arthropoda
- Subphylum: Chelicerata
- Class: Arachnida
- Order: Pseudoscorpiones
- Superfamily: Garypoidea
- Family: Garypidae; Simon, 1879

= Garypidae =

Family of arachnids

Garypidae is a family of pseudoscorpions, first described by Eugène Simon in 1879.

== Genera ==
As of October 2023, the World Pseudoscorpiones Catalog accepts the following eleven genera:

- Ammogarypus Beier, 1962
- Anagarypus Chamberlin, 1930
- Anchigarypus Harvey, 2020
- Elattogarypus Beier, 1964
- Eremogarypus Beier, 1955
- Garypus L. Koch, 1873
- Meiogarypus Beier, 1955
- Neogarypus Vachon, 1937
- Paragarypus Vachon, 1937
- Synsphyronus Chamberlin, 1930
- Thaumastogarypus Beier, 1947
