= Melanochyla bullata =

Conservation status
- Vulnerable (IUCN 3.1)

Scientific classification
- Kingdom: Plantae
- Clade: Tracheophytes
- Clade: Angiosperms
- Clade: Eudicots
- Clade: Rosids
- Order: Sapindales
- Family: Anacardiaceae
- Genus: Melanochyla
- Species: M. bullata

Binomial name
- Melanochyla bullata Ding Hou

Species of flowering plant

Melanochyla bullata is a flowering plant in the family Anacardiaceae. It is native to Borneo.

== Description ==
Melanochyla bullata grows as a tree up to 30 m (100 ft) tall, with a trunk diameter of up to 80 cm (30 in). The brown bark is smooth or scaly. The leaves are obovate to oblanceoate and measure up to 42 cm (17 in) long and to 9 cm (4 in) wide. The inflorescences, in panicles, feature yellow flowers. The ovoid fruits are velvety and measure up to 4.5 cm (1.8 in) long.

== Taxonomy ==
Melanochyla bullata was first described in 1978 by Dutch botanist Ding Hou in Blumea. The type specimen was collected in Sarawak on Borneo. The specific epithet bullata means 'inflated', referring to the upper surface of the leaves.

== Distribution and habitat ==
Melanochyla bullata is endemic to Borneo. Its habitat is in lowland forests, to elevations of 500 m (1,600 ft).

== Conservation ==
Melanochyla bullata has been assessed as vulnerable on the IUCN Red List. Its habitat is threatened by deforestation and by conversion of land for plantations and agriculture. The species is present in two protected areas.
