= Melanochyla castaneifolia =

Conservation status
- Least Concern (IUCN 3.1)

Scientific classification
- Kingdom: Plantae
- Clade: Tracheophytes
- Clade: Angiosperms
- Clade: Eudicots
- Clade: Rosids
- Order: Sapindales
- Family: Anacardiaceae
- Genus: Melanochyla
- Species: M. castaneifolia

Binomial name
- Melanochyla castaneifolia Ding Hou

Species of flowering plant

Melanochyla castaneifolia is a flowering plant in the family Anacardiaceae. It is native to Borneo.

== Description ==
Melanochyla castaneifolia grows as a tree up to 24 m (80 ft) tall, with a trunk diameter of up to 30 cm (12 in). The twigs are white to grey. The leathery leaves are oblong, obovate or elliptic and measure up to 14 cm (6 in) long and to 5 cm (2 in) wide. The inflorescences, in panicles, feature yellow flowers.

== Taxonomy ==
Melanochyla castaneifolia was first described in 1978 by Dutch botanist Ding Hou in the journal Blumea. The type specimen was collected in Sarawak in Borneo. The specific epithet castaneifolia means 'chestnut-coloured leaf'.

== Distribution and habitat ==
Melanochyla castaneifolia is endemic to Borneo. Its habitat is in lowland forests to elevations of 350 m (1,000 ft).

== Conservation ==
Melanochyla castaneifolia has been assessed as least concern on the IUCN Red List. Its habitat is threatened by deforestation and by conversion of land for plantations and agriculture. However, the species is widespread and thought to be present in numerous protected areas.
