= Gluta beccarii =

Conservation status
- Near Threatened (IUCN 3.1)

Scientific classification
- Kingdom: Plantae
- Clade: Tracheophytes
- Clade: Angiosperms
- Clade: Eudicots
- Clade: Rosids
- Order: Sapindales
- Family: Anacardiaceae
- Genus: Gluta
- Species: G. beccarii

Binomial name
- Gluta beccarii (Engl.) Ding Hou

Synonyms
- Melanorrhoea beccarii Engl.

Species of flowering plant

Gluta beccarii is a flowering plant in the family Anacardiaceae. It is native to Southeast Asia.

== Description ==
Gluta beccarii grows as a tree up to 25 m (80 ft) tall with a trunk diameter of up to 45 cm (18 in), with buttress roots. The smooth bark is brown. The leathery leaves are obovate and measure up to 9.5 cm (4 in) long and up to 5 cm (2 in) wide. The flowers are white to pink. The roundish fruits are red to purple and measure up to 1.5 cm (0.6 in) wide. Gluta beccarii most closely resembles Gluta aptera.

== Taxonomy ==
Gluta beccarii was first described as Melanorrhoea beccarii by German botanist Adolf Engler in 1881. In 1978, Dutch botanist Ding Hou transferred the species to the genus Gluta. The type specimen was collected in Sarawak on Borneo. The specific epithet beccarii honours the Italian botanist Odoardo Beccari.

== Distribution and habitat ==
Gluta beccarii is native to Borneo and Peninsular Malaysia. Its habitat is in lowland forests, including in peat swamp forest, at elevations to 600 m (2,000 ft).

== Conservation ==
Gluta beccarii has been assessed as near threatened on the IUCN Red List. The species' habitat is threatened by deforestation and conversion of land for plantations and agriculture. However, the species is present in numerous protected areas.
