= Melanochyla caesia =

Conservation status
- Vulnerable (IUCN 3.1)

Scientific classification
- Kingdom: Plantae
- Clade: Tracheophytes
- Clade: Angiosperms
- Clade: Eudicots
- Clade: Rosids
- Order: Sapindales
- Family: Anacardiaceae
- Genus: Melanochyla
- Species: M. caesia

Binomial name
- Melanochyla caesia (Blume) Ding Hou

Synonyms
- Cassuvium caesium (Blume) Kuntze; Semecarpus caesius Blume; Melanochyla maingayi Hook.f.

Species of flowering plant

Melanochyla caesia is a flowering plant in the family Anacardiaceae. It is native to Southeast Asia.

== Description ==
Melanochyla caesia grows as a tree up to 27 m (90 ft) tall, with a trunk diameter of up to 30 cm (12 in). The brown or grey bark is smooth or scaly. The leathery leaves are lanceolate or oblong and measure up to 20 cm (8 in) long and to 4.5 cm (1.8 in) wide. The inflorescences, in panicles, feature yellow or white flowers. The smooth fruits measure up to 5 cm (2 in) long.

== Taxonomy ==
Melanochyla caesia was first described in 1850 as Semecarpus caesius by botanist Carl Ludwig Blume in the journal Blumea. In 1978, Dutch botanist Ding Hou transferred the species to the genus Melanochyla. The specific epithet caesia means 'blueish', referring to the lower surface of the leaves.

== Distribution and habitat ==
Melanochyla caesia is native to Peninsular Malaysia, Singapore, Sumatra and Borneo. Its habitat is in lowland dipterocarp and kerangas forests to elevations of 500 m (1,600 ft).

== Conservation ==
Melanochyla caesia has been assessed as vulnerable on the IUCN Red List. Its habitat is threatened by deforestation, especially in Sumatra and Borneo. It is present in two protected areas.
