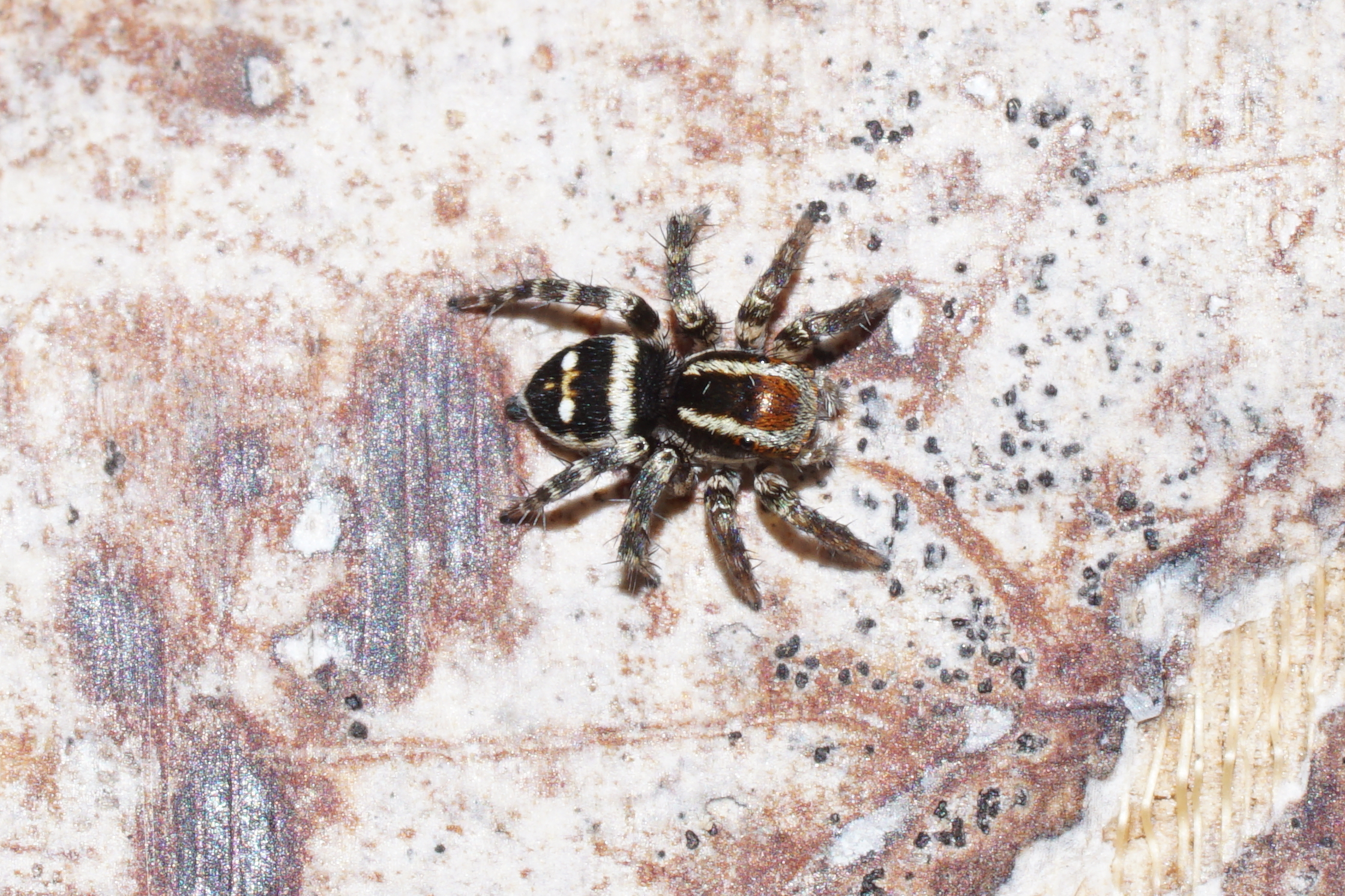
- The related Stenaelurillus albus

Scientific classification
- Kingdom: Animalia
- Phylum: Arthropoda
- Subphylum: Chelicerata
- Class: Arachnida
- Order: Araneae
- Infraorder: Araneomorphae
- Family: Salticidae
- Genus: Stenaelurillus
- Species: S. furcatus

Binomial name
- Stenaelurillus furcatus Wesołowska, 2014

= Stenaelurillus furcatus =

Species of spider

Stenaelurillus furcatus is a species of jumping spider in the genus Stenaelurillus that lives in Namibia. It was first described in 2014 by Wanda Wesołowska. The spider is small, with a brown cephalothorax between 2.2 and 2.9 mm (0.087 and 0.114 in) in length and a black abdomen between 2.0 and 3.6 mm (0.079 and 0.142 in) long. The carapace is brown and covered in scales, while the abdomen is a black oval. The chelicerae are yellow to light brown. It can be distinguished from other members of the genus by the short forked appendage on the male's palpal bulb, after which the spider gets its name. The female has a distinctive arrangement of a deep pocket and separated copulatory openings in the epigyne.

== Taxonomy ==
Stenaelurillus furcatus was first described by Wanda Wesołowska in 2014. It is one of over 500 species identified by the Polish arachnologist. The genus Stenaelurillus was first raised by Eugène Simon in 1885. The name relates to the genus name Aelurillus, which itself derives from the Greek word for cat, with the addition of a Greek stem meaning narrow. In 2017, it was grouped with nine other genera of jumping spiders under the name Aelurillines. It has been placed in the subtribe Aelurillina in the tribe Aelurillini in the clade Saltafresia. The species name is the Latin word for forked and refers to the shape of the appendages on the palpal bulb of the male.

== Description ==
The spider is small. The male has a cephalothorax that measures between 2.2 and 2.4 mm (0.087 and 0.094 in) in length and between 1.5 and 1.75 mm (0.059 and 0.069 in) in width. It has a brown oval carapace covered in scales and with white streaks that stretch from across its back. It has a black oval abdomen, with small indistinct white patches. It is between 2.0 and 2.3 mm (0.079 and 0.091 in) long and 1.6 and 1.7 mm (0.063 and 0.067 in) wide. The chelicerae are yellow to light brown and the legs are generally yellow. with black spots. The pedipalps are also yellow. It has a short embolus. It can be distinguished from other members of the genus by the forked appendage on its palpal bulb. The other Stenaelurillus species with a similar fork, Stenaelurillus wandae, has longer prongs, which are also of a similar length.

The female is very similar to the male, and to the female Stenaelurillus guttiger, Stenaelurillus kavango and Stenaelurillus latibulbis. It is slightly larger, with a cephalothorax between 2.7 and 2.9 mm (0.11 and 0.11 in) long and 2.0 and 2.1 mm (0.079 and 0.083 in) wide and an abdomen between 3.2 and 3.6 in (81 and 91 mm) long and 2.6 and 2.7 mm (0.10 and 0.11 in) wide. it is distinguishable from other species by the deep central pocket, separated copulatory openings and lack of any depression on the epigyne.

== Distribution ==
The distribution is endemic to Namibia. The holotype was identified in the Etosha National Park in KwaZulu-Natal based on a specimen collected in 1998. It has also been found in other areas of the north of the country.
