= Melanochyla minutiflora =

Conservation status
- Vulnerable (IUCN 3.1)

Scientific classification
- Kingdom: Plantae
- Clade: Tracheophytes
- Clade: Angiosperms
- Clade: Eudicots
- Clade: Rosids
- Order: Sapindales
- Family: Anacardiaceae
- Genus: Melanochyla
- Species: M. minutiflora

Binomial name
- Melanochyla minutiflora Ding Hou

Species of flowering plant

Melanochyla minutiflora is a flowering plant in the family Anacardiaceae. It is native to Borneo.

== Description ==
Melanochyla minutiflora grows as a tree up to 15 m (50 ft) tall, with a trunk diameter of up to 30 cm (12 in). The brown or grey bark is scaly. The leaves are oblong to elliptic and measure up to 16.5 cm (6 in) long and to 5 cm (2 in) wide. The inflorescences, in panicles, feature yellow flowers. The roundish fruits are smooth and measure up to 1.2 cm (0.5 in) in diameter.

== Taxonomy ==
Melanochyla minutiflora was first described in 1978 by Dutch botanist Ding Hou in the journal Blumea. The specific epithet minutiflora means 'very small flower'.

== Distribution and habitat ==
Melanochyla minutiflora is endemic to Borneo. Its habitat is in lowland forests to elevations of 100 m (300 ft).

== Conservation ==
Melanochyla minutiflora has been assessed as vulnerable on the IUCN Red List. Its habitat is threatened by deforestation and by conversion of land for plantations and agriculture. The species is present in at least one protected area.
