= Melanochyla fulvinervis =

Conservation status
- Least Concern (IUCN 3.1)

Scientific classification
- Kingdom: Plantae
- Clade: Tracheophytes
- Clade: Angiosperms
- Clade: Eudicots
- Clade: Rosids
- Order: Sapindales
- Family: Anacardiaceae
- Genus: Melanochyla
- Species: M. fulvinervis

Binomial name
- Melanochyla fulvinervis (Blume) Ding Hou

Synonyms
- Cassuvium fulvinerve (Blume) Kuntze; Semecarpus fulvinervis Blume; Melanochyla fulvinervia (Blume) Ding Hou; Melanochyla rugosa King

Species of flowering plant

Melanochyla fulvinervis is a flowering plant in the family Anacardiaceae. It is native to Southeast Asia.

== Description ==
Melanochyla fulvinervis grows as a tree up to 24 m (80 ft) tall, with a trunk diameter of up to 50 cm (20 in). The smooth bark is brown. The leathery leaves are oblanceolate, oblong or elliptic and measure up to 29.5 cm (12 in) long and to 8 cm (3 in) wide. The inflorescences, in panicles, feature white flowers. The roundish or ellipsoid fruits measure up to 4 cm (1.6 in) long.

== Taxonomy ==
Melanochyla fulvinervis was first described as Semecarpus fulvinervis in 1850 by German-Dutch botanist Carl Ludwig Blume. In 1978, Dutch botanist Ding Hou transferred the species to the genus Melanochyla. The lectotype was collected in Borneo. The specific epithet fulvinervis means 'yellow-brown vein'.

== Distribution and habitat ==
Melanochyla fulvinervis is native to Borneo and Peninsular Malaysia. Its habitat is in lowland or hill forests, to elevations of 750 m (2,500 ft).

== Conservation ==
Melanochyla fulvinervis has been assessed as least concern on the IUCN Red List. Its habitat is threatened by deforestation and by conversion of land for plantations and agriculture. However, the species is widespread and is present in a number of protected areas.
