= Melanochyla semecarpoides =

Conservation status
- Endangered (IUCN 3.1)

Scientific classification
- Kingdom: Plantae
- Clade: Tracheophytes
- Clade: Angiosperms
- Clade: Eudicots
- Clade: Rosids
- Order: Sapindales
- Family: Anacardiaceae
- Genus: Melanochyla
- Species: M. semecarpoides

Binomial name
- Melanochyla semecarpoides Ding Hou

Species of flowering plant

Melanochyla semecarpoides is a flowering plant in the family Anacardiaceae. It is native to Borneo.

== Description ==
Melanochyla semecarpoides grows as a tree up to 10 m (33 ft) tall, with a trunk diameter of up to 10 cm (4 in). The leathery leaves are oblanceolate or oblong and measure up to 25 cm (10 in) long and to 10 cm (4 in) wide. The flowers have triangular petals. The fruits are ellipsoid.

== Taxonomy ==
Melanochyla semecarpoides was first described in 1978 by Dutch botanist Ding Hou in the journal Blumea. The type specimen was collected in Sarawak in Borneo. The specific epithet semecarpoides means 'like Semecarpus', referring to the genus.

== Distribution and habitat ==
Melanochyla semecarpoides is endemic to Borneo, where it is confined to Sarawak and Sabah. Its habitat is in dipterocarp forests, to elevations of 200 m (700 ft).

== Conservation ==
Melanochyla semecarpoides has been assessed as endangered on the IUCN Red List. Its habitat is threatened by conversion of land for plantations and urban development. However, the species is present in at least three protected areas.
