= Gluta curtisii =

Conservation status
- Vulnerable (IUCN 3.1)

Scientific classification
- Kingdom: Plantae
- Clade: Tracheophytes
- Clade: Angiosperms
- Clade: Eudicots
- Clade: Rosids
- Order: Sapindales
- Family: Anacardiaceae
- Genus: Gluta
- Species: G. curtisii

Binomial name
- Gluta curtisii (Oliv.) Ding Hou

Species of tree

Gluta curtisii is a species of plant in the family Anacardiaceae. It is a tree found in Peninsular Malaysia and Borneo. Any contact with this plant causes severe rash symptoms.
