= Melanochyla borneensis =

Conservation status
- Data Deficient (IUCN 3.1)

Scientific classification
- Kingdom: Plantae
- Clade: Tracheophytes
- Clade: Angiosperms
- Clade: Eudicots
- Clade: Rosids
- Order: Sapindales
- Family: Anacardiaceae
- Genus: Melanochyla
- Species: M. borneensis

Binomial name
- Melanochyla borneensis (Ridl.) Ding Hou

Synonyms
- Nothopegia borneensis Ridl.

Species of flowering plant

Melanochyla borneensis is a flowering plant in the family Anacardiaceae. It is native to Borneo.

== Description ==
Melanochyla borneensis grows as a tree up to 25 m (80 ft) tall, with a trunk diameter of up to 30 cm (12 in). The grey bark is smooth. The leathery leaves are oblong, elliptic or obovate and measure up to 28.5 cm (11 in) long and to 12 cm (5 in) wide. The inflorescences feature yellow flowers.

== Taxonomy ==
Melanochyla borneensis was first described as Nothopegia borneensis in 1933 by English botanist Henry Nicholas Ridley in the Kew Bulletin of Miscellaneous Information. In 1978, Dutch botanist Ding Hou transferred the species to the genus Melanochyla. The type specimen was collected in Sarawak on Borneo. The species is named for Borneo.

== Distribution and habitat ==
Melanochyla borneensis is endemic to Borneo, where it is confined to Semengoh Nature Reserve in Sarawak. Its habitat is in lowland forests, to elevations of 150 m (500 ft).

== Conservation ==
Melanochyla borneensis has been assessed as data deficient on the IUCN Red List. The species' entire range and population is unknown. Its habitat is potentially threatened by nearby urbanisation. The Semengoh Nature Reserve is a protected area.
