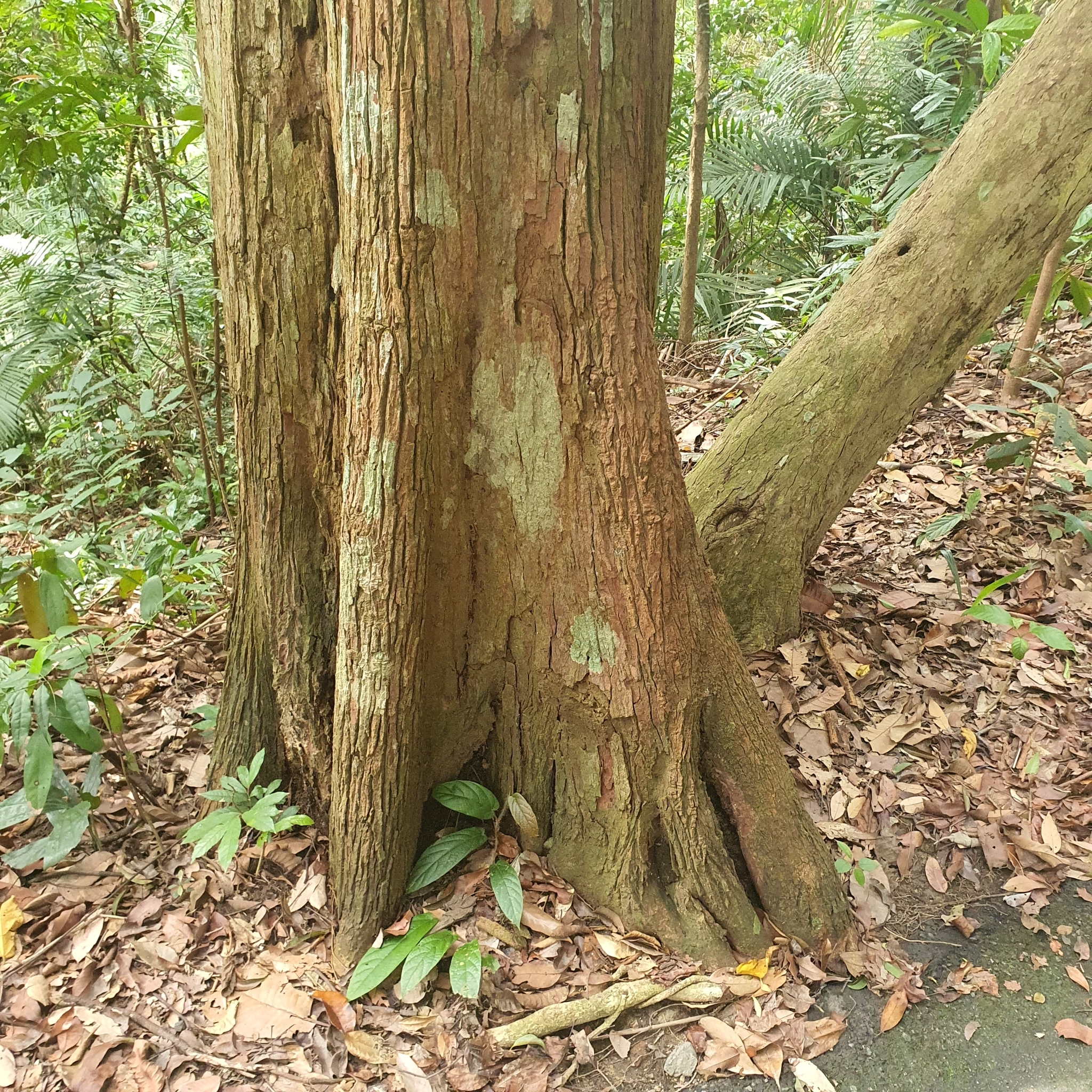
- In Singapore

Conservation status
- Least Concern (IUCN 3.1)

Scientific classification
- Kingdom: Plantae
- Clade: Tracheophytes
- Clade: Angiosperms
- Clade: Eudicots
- Clade: Rosids
- Order: Sapindales
- Family: Anacardiaceae
- Genus: Gluta
- Species: G. wallichii

Binomial name
- Gluta wallichii (Hook.f.) Ding Hou

Synonyms
- Melanorrhoea wallichii Hook.f.

= Gluta wallichii =

Species of flowering plant

Gluta wallichii is a flowering plant in the family Anacardiaceae. It is native to Southeast Asia.

== Description ==
Gluta wallichii grows as a tree up to 36 m (120 ft) tall with a trunk diameter of up to 50 cm (20 in), with buttress roots. The brown to grey bark is scaly with fissures. The leaves are obovate, elliptic or oblong and measure up to 34 cm (13 in) long and up to 14 cm (6 in) wide. The flowers, in panicles, are white. The brownish fruits measure up to 1.5 cm (0.6 in) wide.

== Taxonomy ==
Gluta wallichii was first described as Melanorrhoea wallichii by Brotish botanist Joseph Dalton Hooker in 1876. In 1978, Dutch botanist Ding Hou transferred the species to the genus Gluta. The specific epithet wallichii honours the Danish botanist Nathaniel Wallich.

== Subspecies ==
Plants of the World Online recognises these subspecies:

- Gluta wallichii subsp. lafrankiei P.S.Ashton
- Gluta wallichii subsp. wallichii

== Distribution and habitat ==
Gluta wallichii is native to Borneo, Peninsular Malaysia, Singapore and Sumatra. Its habitat is in swamp and dipterocarp forests, at elevations to 1,000 m (3,300 ft).

== Conservation ==
Gluta wallichii has been assessed as least concern on the IUCN Red List. The species' habitat is threatened by conversion of land for other uses. It is not known to be present in any protected areas.
