= Gluta rugulosa =

Scientific classification
- Kingdom: Plantae
- Clade: Tracheophytes
- Clade: Angiosperms
- Clade: Eudicots
- Clade: Rosids
- Order: Sapindales
- Family: Anacardiaceae
- Genus: Gluta
- Species: G. rugulosa

Binomial name
- Gluta rugulosa Ding Hou

Species of tree

Gluta rugulosa is a tree of Borneo in the cashew and sumac family Anacardiaceae. The specific epithet rugulosa is from the Latin meaning 'wrinkled', referring to the fruits.

== Description ==
Gluta rugulosa grows as a tree up to 30 metres (100 ft) tall with a trunk diameter of up to 60 cm (24 in). Its scaly bark is coloured brown. The large leaves measure up to 26.5 cm (10 in) long. Its roundish fruits measure up to 3.5 cm (1 in) in diameter, are coloured light brown and are scurfy and wrinkled.

== Distribution and habitat ==
Gluta rugulosa is endemic to Borneo. Its habitat is lowland forests, including kerangas forests.
