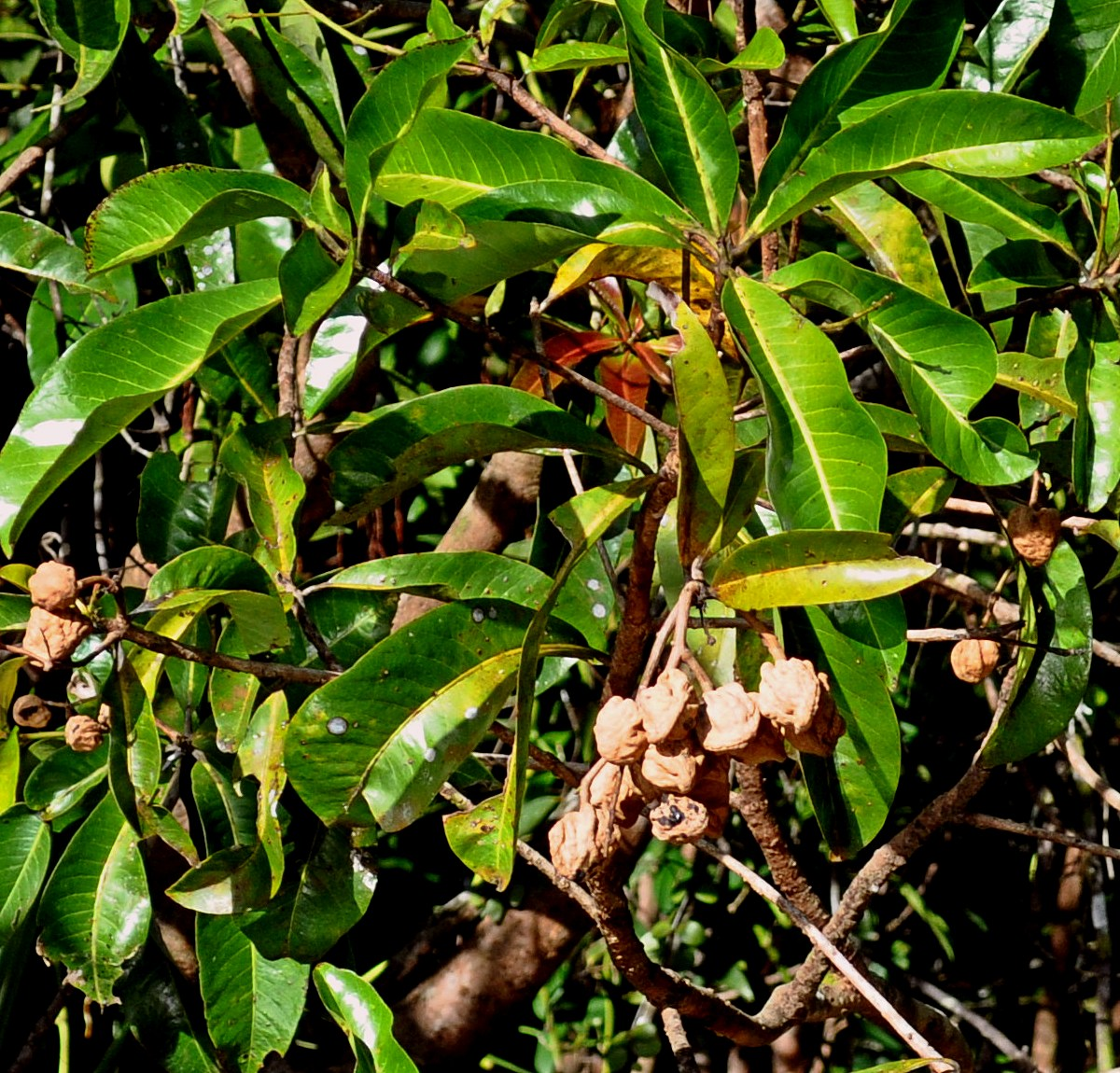
- Gluta velutina
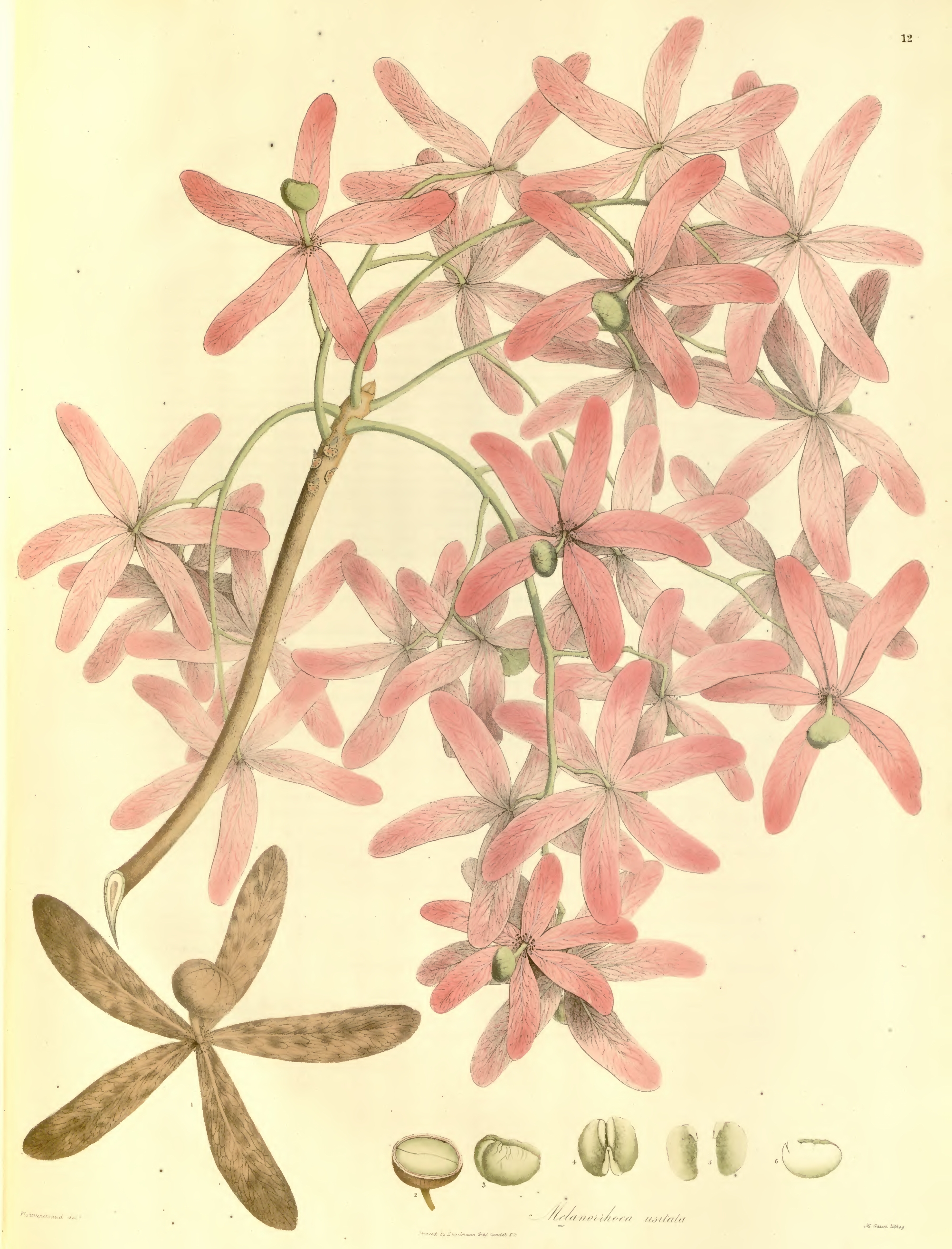
- Botanical illustration of Gluta usitata

Scientific classification
- Kingdom: Plantae
- Clade: Embryophytes
- Clade: Tracheophytes
- Clade: Angiosperms
- Clade: Eudicots
- Clade: Rosids
- Order: Sapindales
- Family: Anacardiaceae
- Subfamily: Anacardioideae
- Genus: Gluta; L.

Synonyms
- Melanorrhoea Wall.; Stagmaria Jack; Syndesmis Wall.

= Gluta =

Genus of flowering plants

Gluta is a genus of plant in the subfamily Anacardioideae of the family Anacardiaceae. Species can be found in Madagascar, India, Indo-China, Malesia through to New Guinea.

Before the work of Ding Hou, several species were placed in the genus Melanorrhoea.

== Species ==
As of February 2025, Plants of the World online has 35 accepted species:

- Gluta aptera (King) Ding Hou
- Gluta beccarii (Engl.) Ding Hou
- Gluta cambodiana Pierre
- Gluta capituliflora Ding Hou
- Gluta celebica Kosterm.
- Gluta compacta Evrard
- Gluta curtisii (Oliver) Ding Hou
- Gluta elegans (Wall.) Kurz
- Gluta glabra (Wall.) Ding Hou
- Gluta gracilis Evrard
- Gluta laccifera (Pierre) Ding Hou
- Gluta lanceolata Ridl.
- Gluta laosensis Tagane & Kameda
- Gluta laxiflora Ridl.
- Gluta longipetiolata Kurz
- Gluta macrocarpa (Engl.) Ding Hou
- Gluta malayana (Corner) Ding Hou
- Gluta megalocarpa (Evrard) Tardieu
- Gluta oba (Merr.) Ding Hou
- Gluta obovata Craib
- Gluta papuana Ding Hou
- Gluta pubescens (Ridl.) Ding Hou
- Gluta renghas L. - type species
- Gluta rostrata Ding Hou
- Gluta rugulosa Ding Hou
- Gluta sabahana Ding Hou
- Gluta speciosa (Ridl.) Ding Hou
- Gluta tavoyana Hook.f.
- Gluta torquata (King) Tardieu
- Gluta tourtour Marchand
- Gluta travancorica Bedd.
- Gluta usitata (Wall.) Ding Hou
- Gluta velutina Blume
- Gluta wallichii (Hook.f.) Ding Hou
- Gluta wrayi King

== Toxicity ==
The plants can cause contact dermatitis, in the same fashion as poison ivy and poison oak.
