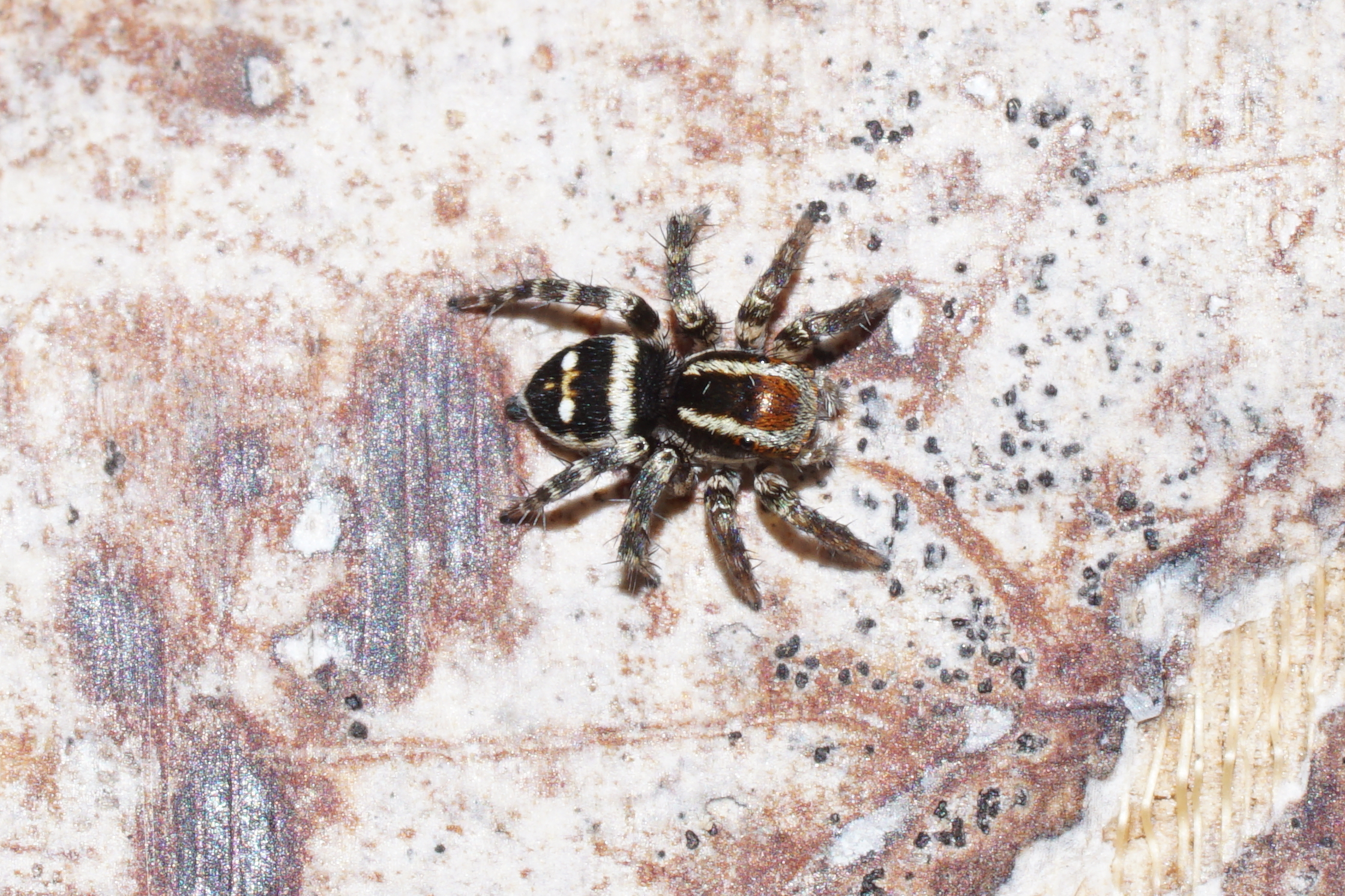
- The related Stenaelurillus albus

Scientific classification
- Kingdom: Animalia
- Phylum: Arthropoda
- Subphylum: Chelicerata
- Class: Arachnida
- Order: Araneae
- Infraorder: Araneomorphae
- Family: Salticidae
- Genus: Stenaelurillus
- Species: S. kavango

Binomial name
- Stenaelurillus kavango Wesołowska, 2014

= Stenaelurillus kavango =

Species of spider

Stenaelurillus kavango is a species of jumping spider in the genus Stenaelurillus that lives in Namibia. It was first described in 2014 by Wanda Wesołowska from a holotype specimen found in the Kavango Region, after which it takes its name. Only the female has been identified. The spider is small, with a brown cephalothorax 2.8 mm (0.11 in) long and an abdomen 3.1 mm (0.12 in) long. The carapace is hairy, dark brown, and has four white streaks, while the abdomen is brown-black with light stripes. It can be distinguished from other members of the genus by the design of the epigyne, which is oval, and its bean-shaped spermathecae.

== Taxonomy ==
Stenaelurillus kavango was first described by Wanda Wesołowska in 2014. It is one of over 500 species identified by the Polish arachnologist. She placed it in the genus Stenaelurillus, first raised by Eugène Simon in 1886. The name relates to the genus name Aelurillus, which itself derives from the Greek word for cat, with the addition of a Greek stem meaning narrow. The species name is taken from the Kavango Region, where it was first found. In 2015, the genus was placed in the subtribe Aelurillina in the tribe Aelurillini in the clade Saltafresia by Wayne Maddison. Two years later, in 2017, it was grouped with nine other genera of jumping spiders under the name Aelurillines.

== Description ==
Only the female has been described. The spider is small and has an overall shape that is typical for the genus. The cephalothorax is typically 2.8 mm (0.11 in) long and 2.5 mm (0.098 in) wide, while the abdomen is 3.1 mm (0.12 in) long and 2.4 mm (0.094 in) wide. The spider has an almost oval carapace and abdomen. The dark brown carapace is covered with hair and has two lateral white streaks with two more crossing the thorax. The abdomen is brown-black with a light coloured stripe across the middle. The chelicerae and legs are light brown. The eye field is very short and black covered in dense brown bristles and thick short setae. Some of the eyes are circled with short white hairs. The epigyne is oval and has central copulatory openings. The epigyne is larger than the otherwise similar Stenaelurillus latibulbis but has bean-shaped spermathecae. It also very similar to the species Stenaelurillus furcatus and Stenaelurillus guttiger, distinguished only by the shape and proportions of the insemination ducts and primary spermathecae.

== Distribution ==
The species is endemic to Namibia. The holotype was identified in the Kavango Region based on a specimen collected in 1984. It is known only from that local area.
