= Gluta speciosa =

Conservation status
- Least Concern (IUCN 3.1)

Scientific classification
- Kingdom: Plantae
- Clade: Tracheophytes
- Clade: Angiosperms
- Clade: Eudicots
- Clade: Rosids
- Order: Sapindales
- Family: Anacardiaceae
- Genus: Gluta
- Species: G. speciosa

Binomial name
- Gluta speciosa (Ridl.) Ding Hou

Synonyms
- Melanorrhoea speciosa Ridl.

Species of flowering plant

Gluta speciosa is a flowering plant in the family Anacardiaceae. It is native to Borneo.

== Description ==
Gluta speciosa grows as a tree up to 40 m (130 ft) tall with a trunk diameter of up to 80 cm (30 in). There are buttress roots up to 1.5 m (5 ft) high. The fissured bark is brown. The leathery leaves are obovate to oblong and measure up to 17.5 cm (7 in) long and up to 9 cm (4 in) wide. The flowers, in panicles, are white.

== Taxonomy ==
Gluta speciosa was first described as Melanorrhoea speciosa by English botanist Henry Nicholas Ridley in the Kew Bulletin of Miscellaneous Information (later Kew Bulletin) in 1933. In 1978, Dutch botanist Ding Hou transferred the species to the genus Gluta. The type specimen was collected in Sarawak on Borneo. The specific epithet speciosa means 'showy', referring to the flowers.

== Distribution and habitat ==
Gluta speciosa is endemic to Borneo. Its habitat is in lowland forests to 600 m (2,000 ft) elevation.

== Conservation ==
Gluta speciosa has been assessed as least concern on the IUCN Red List. The species' habitat is threatened by deforestation and conversion of land for plantations and agriculture. The species is known to be present in two protected areas.
