= Gluta macrocarpa =

Conservation status
- Least Concern (IUCN 3.1)

Scientific classification
- Kingdom: Plantae
- Clade: Tracheophytes
- Clade: Angiosperms
- Clade: Eudicots
- Clade: Rosids
- Order: Sapindales
- Family: Anacardiaceae
- Genus: Gluta
- Species: G. macrocarpa

Binomial name
- Gluta macrocarpa (Engl.) Ding Hou

Synonyms
- Melanorrhoea macrocarpa Engl.

Species of flowering plant

Gluta macrocarpa is a flowering plant in the family Anacardiaceae. It is native to Southeast Asia.

== Description ==
Gluta macrocarpa grows as a tree up to 36 m (120 ft) tall with a trunk diameter of up to 55 cm (22 in). There are buttress roots up to 1.5 m (5 ft) high. The bark is brown to grey and produces latex. The leaves are elliptic or oblanceolate and measure up to 7.5 cm (3 in) long and up to 5 cm (2 in) wide, occasionally to 25 cm (10 in) long. The flowers are in panicles. The roundish fruits are black to purple and measure up to 4 cm (1.6 in) wide.

== Taxonomy ==
Gluta macrocarpa was first described as Melanorrhoea macrocarpa by German botanist Adolf Engler in Monographiae phanerogamarum in 1883. In 1978, Dutch botanist Ding Hou transferred the species to the genus Gluta. The type specimen was collected in Sarawak on Borneo. The specific epithet macrocarpa means 'large fruit'.

== Distribution and habitat ==
Gluta macrocarpa is native to Borneo, Peninsular Malaysia and Sumatra. Its habitat is in forests to 1,200 m (4,000 ft) elevation.

== Conservation ==
Gluta macrocarpa has been assessed as least concern on the IUCN Red List. The species' habitat is threatened by deforestation and conversion of land for plantations and agriculture. The species is present in some protected areas.
