= Gluta oba =

Conservation status
- Least Concern (IUCN 3.1)

Scientific classification
- Kingdom: Plantae
- Clade: Tracheophytes
- Clade: Angiosperms
- Clade: Eudicots
- Clade: Rosids
- Order: Sapindales
- Family: Anacardiaceae
- Genus: Gluta
- Species: G. oba

Binomial name
- Gluta oba (Merr.) Ding Hou

Synonyms
- Melanorrhoea oba Merr.

Species of flowering plant

Gluta oba is a flowering plant in the family Anacardiaceae. It is native to Borneo.

== Description ==
Gluta oba grows as a tree up to 30 m (100 ft) tall with a trunk diameter of up to 35 cm (14 in). There are buttress roots up to 3 m (10 ft) high. The scaly bark is brown to red with patches of grey. The leathery leaves are elliptic or sometimes obovate and measure up to 15 cm (6 in) long and up to 6 cm (2 in) wide. The flowers are in panicles. The roundish fruits are brown and measure up to 4 cm (1.6 in) wide.

== Taxonomy ==
Gluta oba was first described as Melanorrhoea oba by American botanist Elmer Drew Merrill in the Journal of the Straits Branch of the Royal Asiatic Society in 1917. In 1978, Dutch botanist Ding Hou transferred the species to the genus Gluta. The type specimen was collected in Borneo. The specific epithet oba refers to the local name for the species.

== Distribution and habitat ==
Gluta oba is endemic to Borneo. Its habitat is in lowland dipterocarp forests.

== Conservation ==
Gluta oba has been assessed as least concern on the IUCN Red List. The species' habitat is threatened by deforestation and conversion of land for plantations and agriculture. Its habitat is also threatened by mining and by fires. The species' timber has some commercial uses. Gluta oba is present in numerous protected areas, including Lambir Hills National Park, Bako National Park and Santubong National Park.
