= Gluta laccifera =

Scientific classification
- Kingdom: Plantae
- Clade: Tracheophytes
- Clade: Angiosperms
- Clade: Eudicots
- Clade: Rosids
- Order: Sapindales
- Family: Anacardiaceae
- Subfamily: Anacardioideae
- Genus: Gluta
- Species: G. laccifera

Binomial name
- Gluta laccifera (Pierre) Ding Hou

Synonyms
- Penaea nitida Lour. Melanorrhoea laccifera Pierre; Gluta nitida (Lour.) Merrill

Species of flowering plant

Gluta laccifera is a tree species in the family Anacardiaceae. It can be found in Indo-China and in Viet Nam it may be called sơn tiên or sơn huyết; no subspecies are listed in the Catalogue of Life.
