= Gluta capituliflora =

Conservation status
- Near Threatened (IUCN 3.1)

Scientific classification
- Kingdom: Plantae
- Clade: Tracheophytes
- Clade: Angiosperms
- Clade: Eudicots
- Clade: Rosids
- Order: Sapindales
- Family: Anacardiaceae
- Genus: Gluta
- Species: G. capituliflora

Binomial name
- Gluta capituliflora Ding Hou

Species of tree

Gluta capituliflora is a species of plant in the family Anacardiaceae. It is a tree endemic to Peninsular Malaysia.
