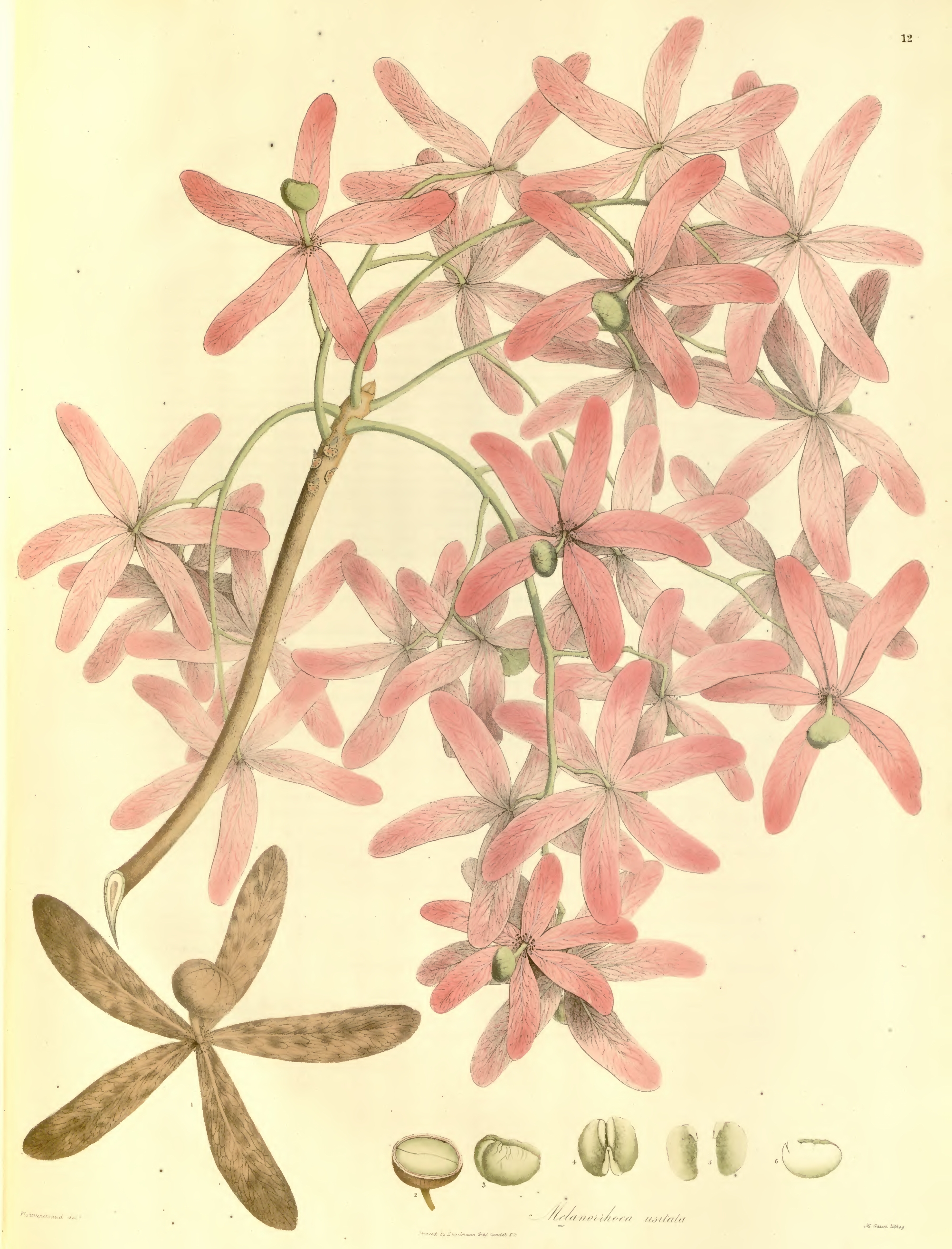
- Illustration by Vishnupersaud from Plantae Asiaticae Rariores

Scientific classification
- Kingdom: Plantae
- Clade: Embryophytes
- Clade: Tracheophytes
- Clade: Angiosperms
- Clade: Eudicots
- Clade: Rosids
- Order: Sapindales
- Family: Anacardiaceae
- Subfamily: Anacardioideae
- Genus: Gluta
- Species: G. usitata

Binomial name
- Gluta usitata (Wall.) Ding Hou

Synonyms
- Melanorrhoea usitata Wall.

= Gluta usitata =

Species of flowering plant

Gluta usitata, previously known as Melanorrhoea usitata, is an Asian tree species in the family Anacardiaceae. It may be known as Burmese lacquer, theetsee, thitsi or ringas.

It has been identified as an endangered species in Vietnam, where it may be called sơn đào.

== Description ==
It is a medium to large deciduous tree from the dry deciduous forest with a straight clean cylindrical bole and a spreading crown of dark green leaves.

This species is used in Myanmar and northern Thailand as a source of lacquer used for producing varnish, waterproof or preservative paint, glue, ceramic and lacquerware. Timber (known as Borneo rosewood) is used for furniture and inlay work.

The tree's sap and sawdust can cause dermatitis and skin irritation.

An incompletely identified 4-heptadec(en)yl catechol, which was named thitsiol, has been reported to occur in this species. Sap also contains urushiol.
