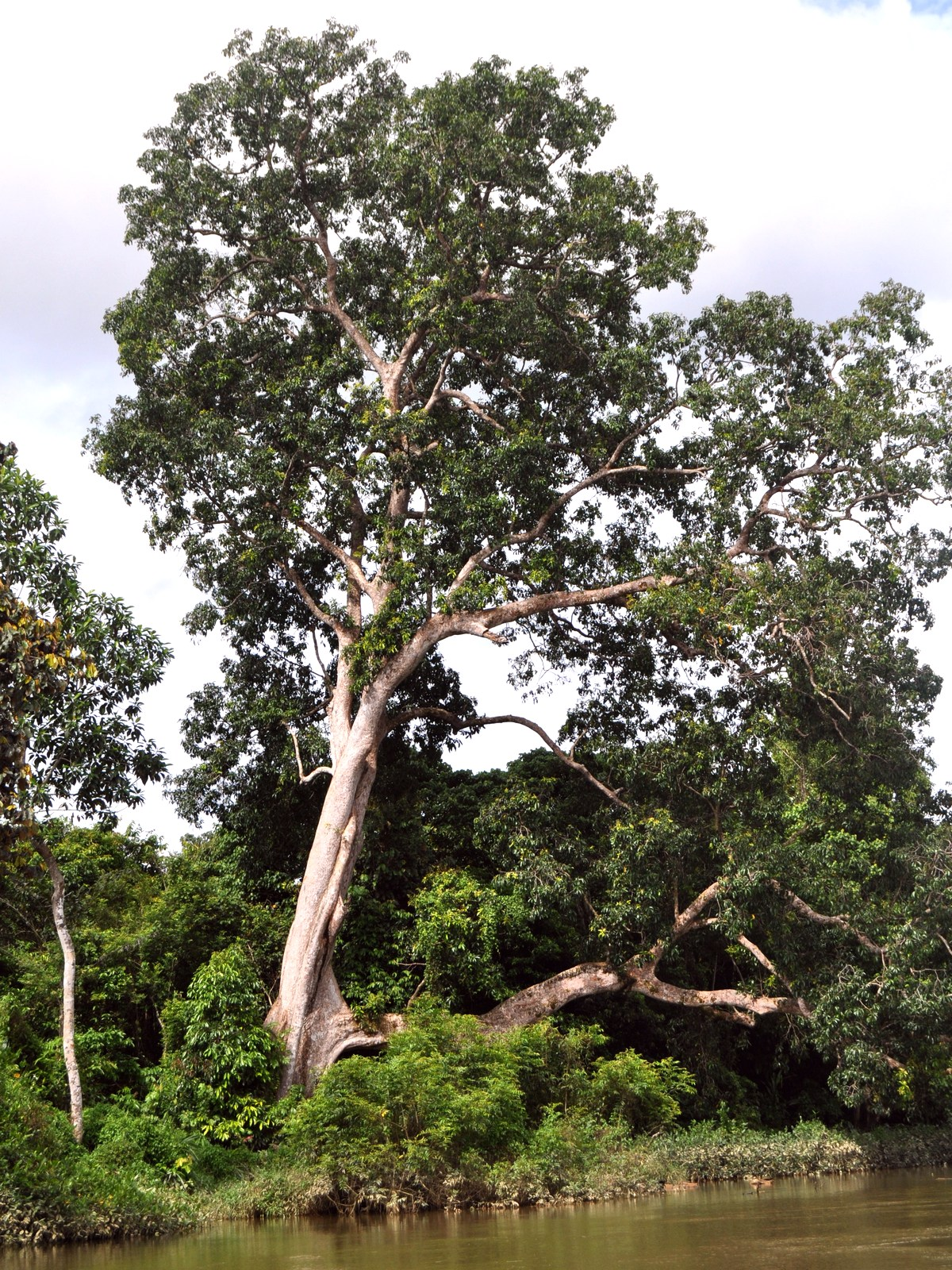
- Gluta renghas tree on Pesaguan Riverbank, West Kalimantan

Scientific classification
- Kingdom: Plantae
- Clade: Tracheophytes
- Clade: Angiosperms
- Clade: Eudicots
- Clade: Rosids
- Order: Sapindales
- Family: Anacardiaceae
- Genus: Gluta
- Species: G. renghas

Binomial name
- Gluta renghas L.

= Gluta renghas =

Species of flowering plant

Gluta renghas, commonly known as the rengas, is a species of plant in the family Anacardiaceae. It is found in Indonesia.

Some rengas trees secrete an oil that can cause painful blistering rashes in orangutans and possibly humans too.
