= Melanochyla axillaris =

Conservation status
- Endangered (IUCN 3.1)

Scientific classification
- Kingdom: Plantae
- Clade: Tracheophytes
- Clade: Angiosperms
- Clade: Eudicots
- Clade: Rosids
- Order: Sapindales
- Family: Anacardiaceae
- Genus: Melanochyla
- Species: M. axillaris

Binomial name
- Melanochyla axillaris Ridl.

Species of flowering plant

Melanochyla axillaris is a flowering plant in the family Anacardiaceae. It is native to Borneo.

== Description ==
Melanochyla axillaris grows as a tree up to 24 m (80 ft) tall, with a trunk diameter of up to 20 cm (8 in). The leaves are oblanceolate and measure up to 67 cm (26 in) long and to 16.5 cm (6.5 in) wide. The inflorescences are in panicles. The fruits are rusty and measure up to 3 cm (1.2 in) wide.

== Taxonomy ==
Melanochyla axillaris was first described by English botanist Henry Nicholas Ridley in 1933 in the Kew Bulletin of Miscellaneous Information (now Kew Bulletin). The type specimen was collected in Sarawak on Borneo. The specific epithet axillaris means 'in an axil', referring to the habit of the flowers.

== Distribution and habitat ==
Melanochyla axillaris is endemic to Borneo, where it is confined to Sarawak. Its habitat is in lowland forests at elevations of 100–450 m (300–1,500 ft).

== Conservation ==
Melanochyla axillaris has been assessed as endangered on the IUCN Red List. The species' habitat is threatened by conversion of land for settlements and palm oil plantations. It is not present in any protected areas.
