= Melanochyla scalarinervis =

Conservation status
- Near Threatened (IUCN 3.1)

Scientific classification
- Kingdom: Plantae
- Clade: Embryophytes
- Clade: Tracheophytes
- Clade: Angiosperms
- Clade: Eudicots
- Clade: Rosids
- Order: Sapindales
- Family: Anacardiaceae
- Genus: Melanochyla
- Species: M. scalarinervis

Binomial name
- Melanochyla scalarinervis Kochummen

Species of flowering plant

Melanochyla scalarinervis is a flowering plant in the family Anacardiaceae. It is native to Borneo.

== Description ==
Melanochyla scalarinervis grows as a tree up to 22 m (70 ft) tall, with a trunk diameter of up to 15 cm (6 in). The black bark is smooth. The leathery leaves are oblong measure up to 25 cm (10 in) long and to 7 cm (2.8 in) wide. The smooth, ellipsoid fruits measure up to 2.5 cm (1 in) long.

== Taxonomy ==
Melanochyla scalarinervis was described by Malaysian botanist Kizhakkedathu Mathai Kochummen in 1996 in Sandakania. The type specimen was collected in Sarawak. The specific epithet scalarinervis means 'ladder-like veins', referring to the leaves.

== Distribution and habitat ==
Melanochyla scalarinervis is endemic to Borneo, where it is confined to Sarawak. Its habitat is in lowland dipterocarp forests, to elevations of 200 m (700 ft).

== Conservation ==
Melanochyla scalarinervis has been assessed as near threatened on the IUCN Red List. The species is confined to Semengoh Nature Reserve where it is currently protected. However, if this protection were to diminish, the species' habitat would probably experience logging and conversion of land for palm oil plantations.
