= Gluta sabahana =

Scientific classification
- Kingdom: Plantae
- Clade: Tracheophytes
- Clade: Angiosperms
- Clade: Eudicots
- Clade: Rosids
- Order: Sapindales
- Family: Anacardiaceae
- Genus: Gluta
- Species: G. sabahana

Binomial name
- Gluta sabahana Ding Hou

Species of tree

Gluta sabahana is a tree of Borneo in the cashew and sumac family Anacardiaceae. The specific epithet sabahana is from the Latin meaning "of Sabah".

== Description ==
Gluta sabahana grows as a tree up to 30 metres (100 ft) tall with a trunk diameter of up to 60 cm (24 in). Its dark brown bark is smooth to scaly. The large leaves measure up to 23 cm (9 in) long. The flowers are whitish. Its ellipsoid fruits measure up to 9 cm (4 in) long and are brownish and scurfy.

== Distribution and habitat ==
Gluta sabahana is endemic to Borneo, where it is confined to Sabah. Its habitat is lowland forests, including swamps, below 30 m (100 ft) elevation.
