= Melanochyla tomentosa =

Conservation status
- Vulnerable (IUCN 3.1)

Scientific classification
- Kingdom: Plantae
- Clade: Tracheophytes
- Clade: Angiosperms
- Clade: Eudicots
- Clade: Rosids
- Order: Sapindales
- Family: Anacardiaceae
- Genus: Melanochyla
- Species: M. tomentosa

Binomial name
- Melanochyla tomentosa Hook. f.

Species of flowering plant

Melanochyla tomentosa is a flowering plant in the family Anacardiaceae. It is native to Southeast Asia.

== Description ==
Melanochyla tomentosa grows as a tree up to 20 m (70 ft) tall, with a trunk diameter of up to 37 cm (15 in). The smooth bark is reddish brown. The leathery leaves are obovate, oblong or elliptic and measure up to 19 cm (7 in) long and to 9 cm (4 in) wide. The inflorescences feature yellow to dark brown flowers. The fruits are smooth and measure up to 3 cm (1.2 in) in diameter.

== Taxonomy ==
Melanochyla tomentosa was first described in 1876 by British botanist Joseph Dalton Hooker in The Flora of British India. The type specimen was collected in Malacca, Malaysia. The specific epithet tomentosa means 'covered with hairs', referring to the leaves and twigs.

== Distribution and habitat ==
Melanochyla tomentosa is native to Borneo, Sumatra, Peninsular Malaysia and Peninsular Thailand. Its habitat is in lowland dipterocarp forests at elevations of 150–250 m (500–800 ft).

== Conservation ==
Melanochyla tomentosa has been assessed as vulnerable on the IUCN Red List. Its habitat is threatened by deforestation and by conversion of land for plantations and agriculture. The species is present in at least three protected areas.
