= Melanochyla nitida =

Conservation status
- Endangered (IUCN 3.1)

Scientific classification
- Kingdom: Plantae
- Clade: Tracheophytes
- Clade: Angiosperms
- Clade: Eudicots
- Clade: Rosids
- Order: Sapindales
- Family: Anacardiaceae
- Genus: Melanochyla
- Species: M. nitida

Binomial name
- Melanochyla nitida King

Species of tree

Melanochyla nitida is a species of flowering plant in the family Anacardiaceae. It is a tree endemic to Peninsular Malaysia.
