= Melanochyla auriculata =

Conservation status
- Near Threatened (IUCN 3.1)

Scientific classification
- Kingdom: Plantae
- Clade: Tracheophytes
- Clade: Angiosperms
- Clade: Eudicots
- Clade: Rosids
- Order: Sapindales
- Family: Anacardiaceae
- Genus: Melanochyla
- Species: M. auriculata

Binomial name
- Melanochyla auriculata Hook.f.

Species of flowering plant

Melanochyla auriculata, the swamp rengas, is a flowering plant in the family Anacardiaceae. It is native to Southeast Asia.

== Description ==
Melanochyla auriculata grows as a tree up to 30 m (100 ft) tall, with a trunk diameter of up to 70 cm (28 in). It has buttresses up to 2 m (7 ft) high. The smooth bark is green to grey. The leaves are obovate and measure up to 46 cm (18 in) long and to 10 cm (4 in) wide. The inflorescences, in panicles, feature white flowers. The fruits are rusty and measure up to 3.5 cm (1.4 in) wide.

== Taxonomy ==
Melanochyla auriculata was first described by British botanist Joseph Dalton Hooker in 1876 in The flora of British India. The type specimen was collected in Malacca. The specific epithet auriculata means 'ear-like', referring to the leaf base.

== Distribution and habitat ==
Melanochyla auriculata is native to Borneo, Peninsular Malaysia and Singapore. Its habitat is in lowland swamp forest and mixed dipterocarp forests.

== Conservation ==
Melanochyla auriculata has been assessed as near threatened on the IUCN Red List. The species' habitat is threatened by deforestation and conversion of land for agriculture, especially in its Borneo range. It is not present in any protected areas.
