= Melanochyla beccariana =

Conservation status
- Least Concern (IUCN 3.1)

Scientific classification
- Kingdom: Plantae
- Clade: Tracheophytes
- Clade: Angiosperms
- Clade: Eudicots
- Clade: Rosids
- Order: Sapindales
- Family: Anacardiaceae
- Genus: Melanochyla
- Species: M. beccariana

Binomial name
- Melanochyla beccariana Oliv.

Synonyms
- Melanochyla ferruginea Merr.

Species of flowering plant

Melanochyla beccariana is a flowering plant in the family Anacardiaceae. It is native to Borneo.

== Description ==
Melanochyla beccariana grows as a tree up to 24 m (80 ft) tall, with a trunk diameter of up to 35 cm (14 in). The leaves are oblong or obovate and measure up to 29 cm (11 in) long and to 12 cm (5 in) wide. The inflorescences are in panicles. The rusty fruits measure up to 4.5 cm (1.8 in) long.

== Taxonomy ==
Melanochyla beccariana was first described in 1894 by English botanist Daniel Oliver in Hooker's Icones Plantarum. The syntypes were collected in Sarawak on Borneo. The species is named for the Italian botanist Odoardo Beccari.

== Distribution and habitat ==
Melanochyla beccariana is endemic to Borneo. Its habitat is in lowland and lower montane forests, to elevations of 1,500 m (5,000 ft).

== Conservation ==
Melanochyla beccariana has been assessed as least concern on the IUCN Red List. However, the species' habitat is threatened by deforestation and by conversion of land for agriculture and plantations. It is present in a number of protected areas.
