= Melanochyla elmeri =

Conservation status
- Least Concern (IUCN 3.1)

Scientific classification
- Kingdom: Plantae
- Clade: Tracheophytes
- Clade: Angiosperms
- Clade: Eudicots
- Clade: Rosids
- Order: Sapindales
- Family: Anacardiaceae
- Genus: Melanochyla
- Species: M. elmeri

Binomial name
- Melanochyla elmeri Merr.

Species of flowering plant

Melanochyla elmeri is a flowering plant in the family Anacardiaceae. It is native to Borneo.

== Description ==
Melanochyla elmeri grows as a tree up to 30 m (100 ft) tall, with a trunk diameter of up to 40 cm (16 in). The fissured bark is brown to grey. The leathery leaves are oblong or obovate and measure up to 23 cm (9 in) long and to 7.5 cm (3 in) wide. The inflorescences, in panicles, feature white flowers. The smooth, ellipsoid fruits measure up to 2.5 cm (1 in) long.

== Taxonomy ==
Melanochyla elmeri was first described in 1929 by American botanist Elmer Drew Merrill in the University of California Publications in Botany. The type specimen was collected in Sabah in Borneo. The specific epithet elmeri honours the American botanist Adolph D. E. Elmer.

== Distribution and habitat ==
Melanochyla elmeri is endemic to Borneo. Its habitat is generally in lowland swamp forests to elevations of 200 m (700 ft), but also on Mount Kinabalu to elevations of 1,500 m (5,000 ft).

== Conservation ==
Melanochyla elmeri has been assessed as least concern on the IUCN Red List. Its habitat is threatened by deforestation and by conversion of land for plantations, agriculture and urban development. However, the species is widespread and is present in a number of protected areas.
