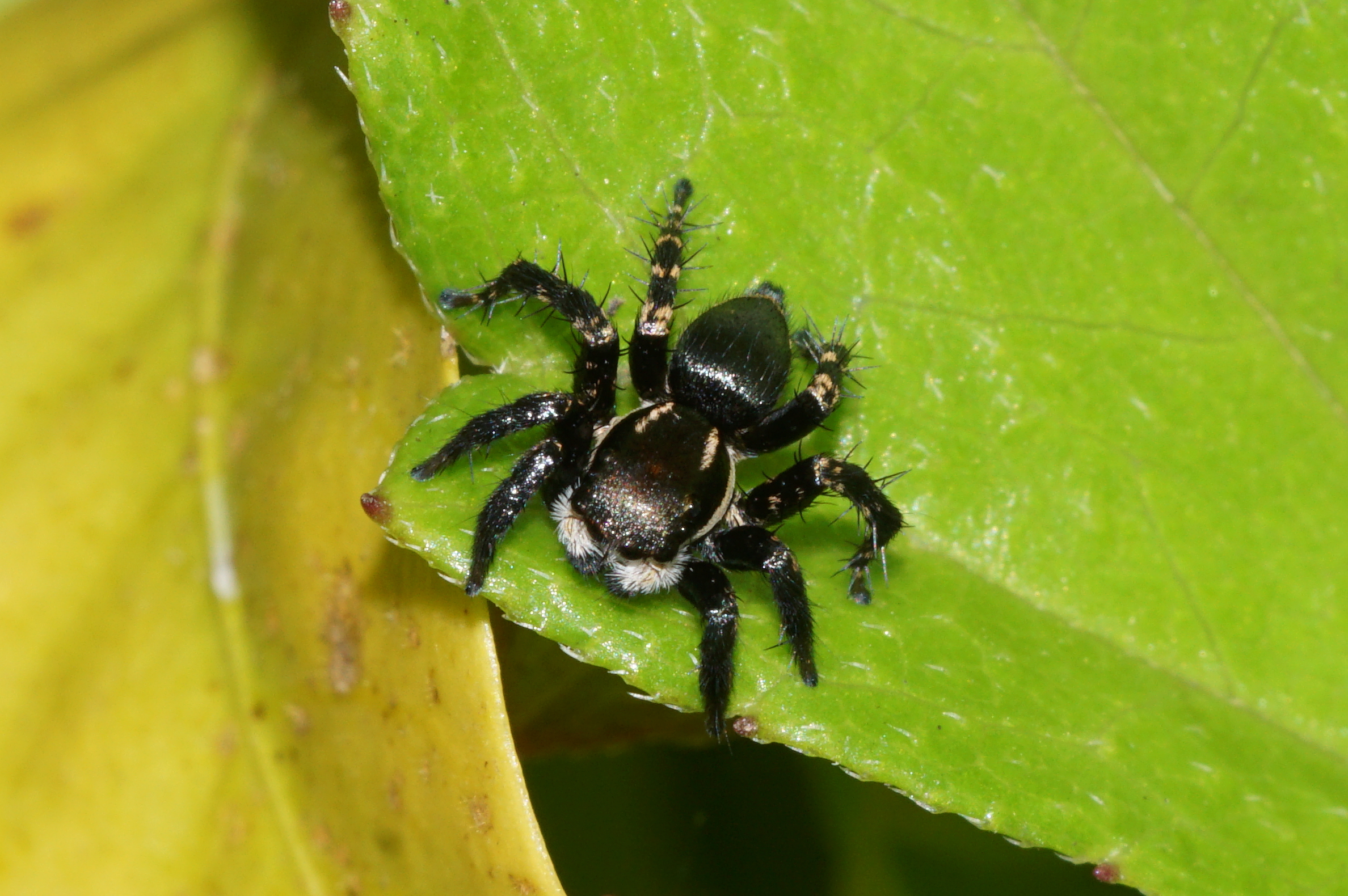
- The related Stenaelurillus albus

Scientific classification
- Kingdom: Animalia
- Phylum: Arthropoda
- Subphylum: Chelicerata
- Class: Arachnida
- Order: Araneae
- Infraorder: Araneomorphae
- Family: Salticidae
- Genus: Stenaelurillus
- Species: S. latibulbis

Binomial name
- Stenaelurillus latibulbis Wesołowska, 2014

= Stenaelurillus latibulbis =

Species of spider

Stenaelurillus latibulbis is a species of jumping spider in the genus Stenaelurillus that lives in Democratic Republic of the Congo and Zambia. It was first described in 2014 by Wanda Wesołowska. The spider is medium-sized, with a dark brown cephalothorax between 2.6 and 3.0 mm (0.10 and 0.12 in) in length and a black abdomen between 1.9 and 3.4 mm (0.075 and 0.134 in) long. The male carapace has patches of white hairs, while the female is marked by two white stripes that stretch from the front to back. The female abdomen has a triangular-shaped white marking. It is distinguished from other members of the genus by the male's short, wide palpal bulb and the female's small epigyne with relatively short insemination ducts and round spermathecae.

== Taxonomy ==
Stenaelurillus latibulbis was first described by Wanda Wesołowska in 2014. It is one of over 500 species identified by the Polish arachnologist. She placed the species in the genus Stenaelurillus, first raised by Eugène Simon in 1886. The name relates to the genus name Aelurillus, which itself derives from the Greek word for cat, with the addition of a Greek stem meaning narrow. In 2015, it was placed in the subtribe Aelurillina in the tribe Aelurillini in the clade Saltafresia by Wayne Maddison. Two years later, in 2017, it was grouped with nine other genera of jumping spiders under the name Aelurillines. The species name recalls the shape of the palpal bulb.

== Description ==
The spider is medium-sized. The male has a cephalothorax that measures between 2.7 and 3.0 mm (0.11 and 0.12 in) in length and between 2.2 and 2.3 mm (0.087 and 0.091 in) in width. The dark brown pear-shaped carapace has a scattering of white hairs. The abdomen is black, between 1.9 and 2.3 mm (0.075 and 0.091 in) long and 1.8 and 1.9 mm (0.071 and 0.075 in) wide, and also has patches of white hairs. eye field is black and is surrounded by long brown bristles. The spinnerets are long and black, and the legs are brown. The pedipalps are also brown and hairy. It can be distinguished from other members of the genus by its wide and relatively short palpal bulb, and the fact that the embolus is almost completely hidden.

The female is very similar to the male in colouration and shape. It has a smaller cephalothorax between 2.6 and 2.7 mm (0.10 and 0.11 in) long and 1.8 and 1.9 mm (0.071 and 0.075 in) wide and a larger abdomen between 2.6 and 3.4 in (66 and 86 mm) long and 2.2 and 2.8 mm (0.087 and 0.110 in) wide. The carapace is also pear-shaped and dark brown, but has two white streaks that extend from the front to back. The abdomen has a wide white marking in the shape of a triangle and two white patches on the rear half. The spinnerets are brown-yellow. The epigyne is small, with large copulatory openings. The epigyne distinguishes the species from the otherwise similar Stenaelurillus kavango, particularly its shorter insemination ducts and round spermathecae.

== Distribution and habitat ==
The species was first identified in Democratic Republic of the Congo based on examples found in Katanga Province in 1974. It was also found in Luambe National Park in Zambia. It prefers to live in savanna.
