= Melanochyla montana =

Conservation status
- Endangered (IUCN 3.1)

Scientific classification
- Kingdom: Plantae
- Clade: Embryophytes
- Clade: Tracheophytes
- Clade: Angiosperms
- Clade: Eudicots
- Clade: Rosids
- Order: Sapindales
- Family: Anacardiaceae
- Genus: Melanochyla
- Species: M. montana

Binomial name
- Melanochyla montana Kochummen

Species of flowering plant

Melanochyla montana is a flowering plant in the family Anacardiaceae. It is native to Borneo.

== Description ==
Melanochyla montana grows as a tree up to 45 m (150 ft) tall, with a trunk diameter of up to 2 m (7 ft). It has buttresses up to 2.5 m (8 ft) high. The grey bark is smooth. The leathery leaves are obovate, oblanceolate or oblong and measure up to 32 cm (13 in) long and to 18 cm (7 in) wide. The wood is locally used in furniture and flooring.

== Taxonomy ==
Melanochyla montana was first described in 1996 by Malaysian botanist Kizhakkedathu Mathai Kochummen in the journal Sandakania. The type specimen was collected in Sabah in Borneo. The specific epithet montana means 'of mountains', referring to its habitat.

== Distribution and habitat ==
Melanochyla montana is endemic to Borneo, where it is confined to Sabah and Sarawak. Its habitat is in montane forests at elevations of 1,350–1,850 m (4,400–6,100 ft).

== Conservation ==
Melanochyla montana has been assessed as endangered on the IUCN Red List. Its habitat is threatened by conversion of land for plantations. However, the species is present in at least three protected areas.
