= Melanochyla woodiana =

Conservation status
- Critically Endangered (IUCN 3.1)

Scientific classification
- Kingdom: Plantae
- Clade: Embryophytes
- Clade: Tracheophytes
- Clade: Angiosperms
- Clade: Eudicots
- Clade: Rosids
- Order: Sapindales
- Family: Anacardiaceae
- Genus: Melanochyla
- Species: M. woodiana

Binomial name
- Melanochyla woodiana Kochummen

Species of flowering plant

Melanochyla woodiana is a flowering plant in the family Anacardiaceae. It is native to Borneo.

== Description ==
Melanochyla woodiana grows as a tree up to 20 m (70 ft) tall. The twigs are whitish. The leathery leaves are oblong or elliptic and measure up to 19 cm (7 in) long and to 10 cm (4 in) wide. The fruits taper to a sharp point and measure up to 2 cm (0.8 in) long.

== Taxonomy ==
Melanochyla woodiana was first described in 1996 by Malaysian botanist Kizhakkedathu Mathai Kochummen in the journal Sandakania. The type specimen was collected in Sabah in Borneo. The species is named for the English botanist Geoffrey Wood.

== Distribution and habitat ==
Melanochyla woodiana is endemic to Borneo, where it is confined to the Beaufort Hills of Sabah. Its habitat is in lowland dipterocarp forests at elevations of about 120 m (400 ft).

== Conservation ==
Melanochyla woodiana has been assessed as critically endangered on the IUCN Red List. Its habitat is threatened by forest fires and by conversion of land for agriculture and plantations. The species is not known from any protected areas.
