= Melanochyla longipetiolata =

Conservation status
- Vulnerable (IUCN 2.3)

Scientific classification
- Kingdom: Plantae
- Clade: Embryophytes
- Clade: Tracheophytes
- Clade: Angiosperms
- Clade: Eudicots
- Clade: Rosids
- Order: Sapindales
- Family: Anacardiaceae
- Genus: Melanochyla
- Species: M. longipetiolata

Binomial name
- Melanochyla longipetiolata Kochummen

Species of flowering plant

Melanochyla longipetiolata is a species of plant in the family Anacardiaceae. It is a tree endemic to Peninsular Malaysia. It is threatened by habitat loss.
