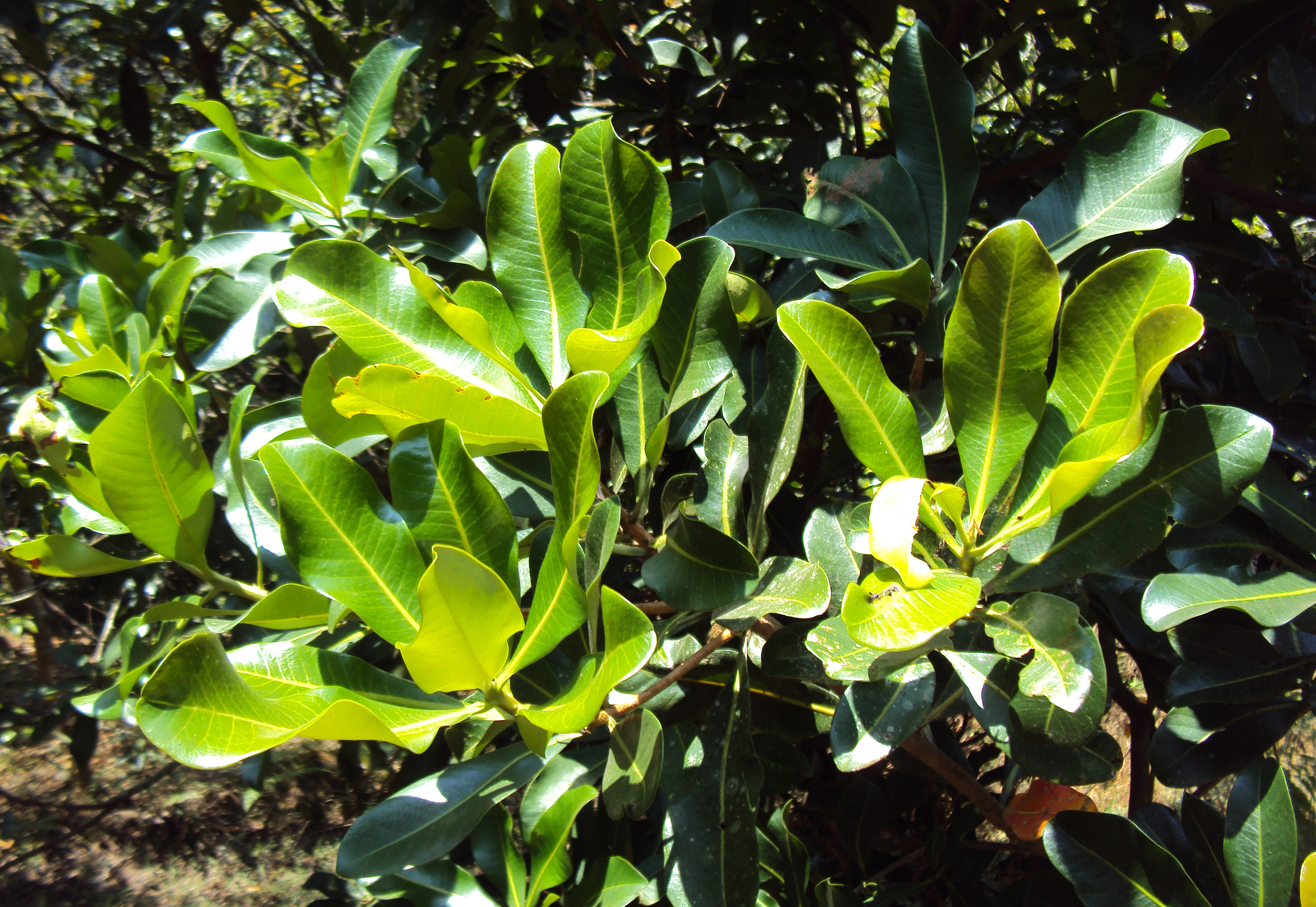
- Leaves

Conservation status
- Near Threatened (IUCN 2.3)

Scientific classification
- Kingdom: Plantae
- Clade: Tracheophytes
- Clade: Angiosperms
- Clade: Eudicots
- Clade: Rosids
- Order: Sapindales
- Family: Anacardiaceae
- Genus: Gluta
- Species: G. travancorica

Binomial name
- Gluta travancorica Bedd.

= Gluta travancorica =

Species of flowering plant

Gluta travancorica (Malayalam: ശെന്തുരുണി; Chenkurinji; Shenduruni; Thodappa) is a species of plant in the family Anacardiaceae. It is endemic to the southern Western Ghats in India.

This species is commonly found in the wet evergreen forests of Southern Kerala, especially Kollam and Trivandrum Districts. The Shendurni wildlife sanctuary in Kollam district is named after this tree.

== Description ==
Evergreen trees growing up to 35 m tall. The trees have a 6-8 mm thick bark that is greyish-brown and smooth, with a pink blaze from which acrid, black sap exudes. The leaves are simple and alternate characteristically clustered at the tips of branchlets giving the appearance of a whorl. The leaves, with 1-2 cm long stout, winged petiole, have a blade that is 8-18 cm long by 3.5 to 7 cm wide. The leaf shape is elliptic ovate to obovate or spathulate, with cuneate or attenuate base and blunt or emarginate apex. The margin is entire and the leaves are thick and glabrous (non-hairy). The leaves have 13-18 pairs of prominent lateral nerves and distinct secondaries. The cream-coloured flowers are bisexual, about 8 mm in diameter, and arranged in axillary and terminal panicles, with a spathaceous and deciduous calyx. The flowers have 4-6 petals with 4-6 stamens, threadlike style, and a single-celled superior ovary with one ovule. The fruit is a round drupe, about 2.5-3.5 cm, brown in colour and scurfy.

== Gallery ==
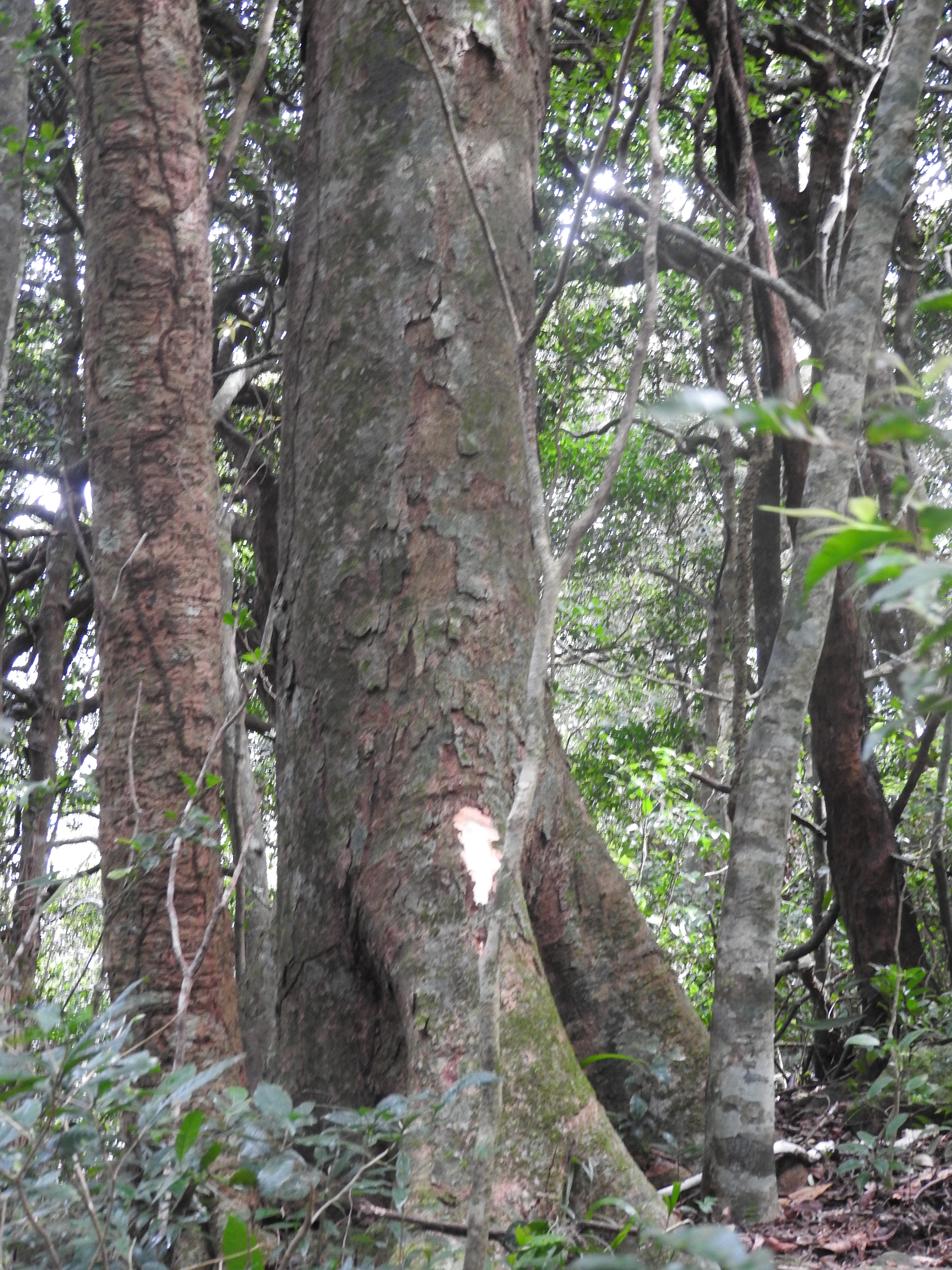
Trunk and bark

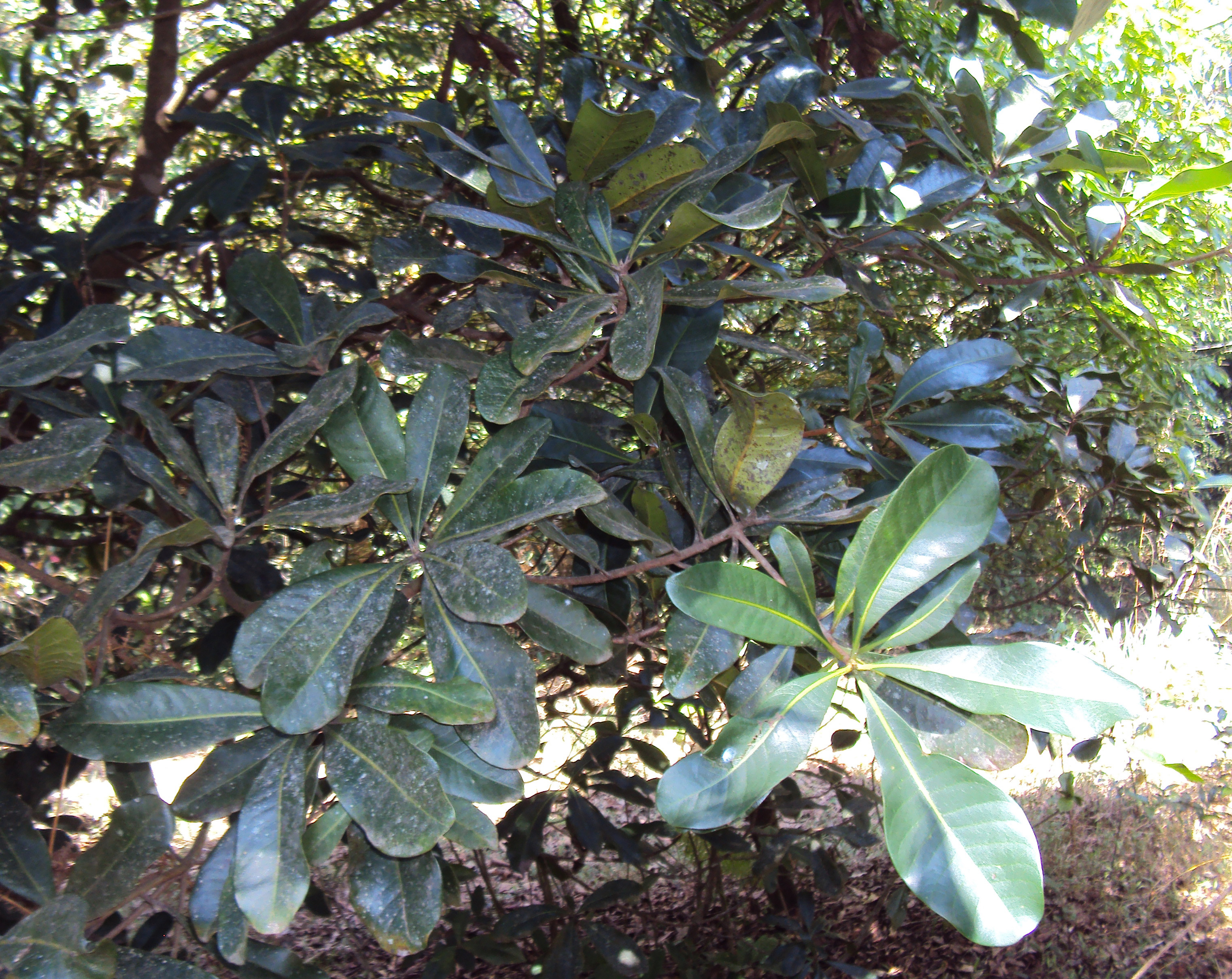
Branchlets showing leaves clustered at ends

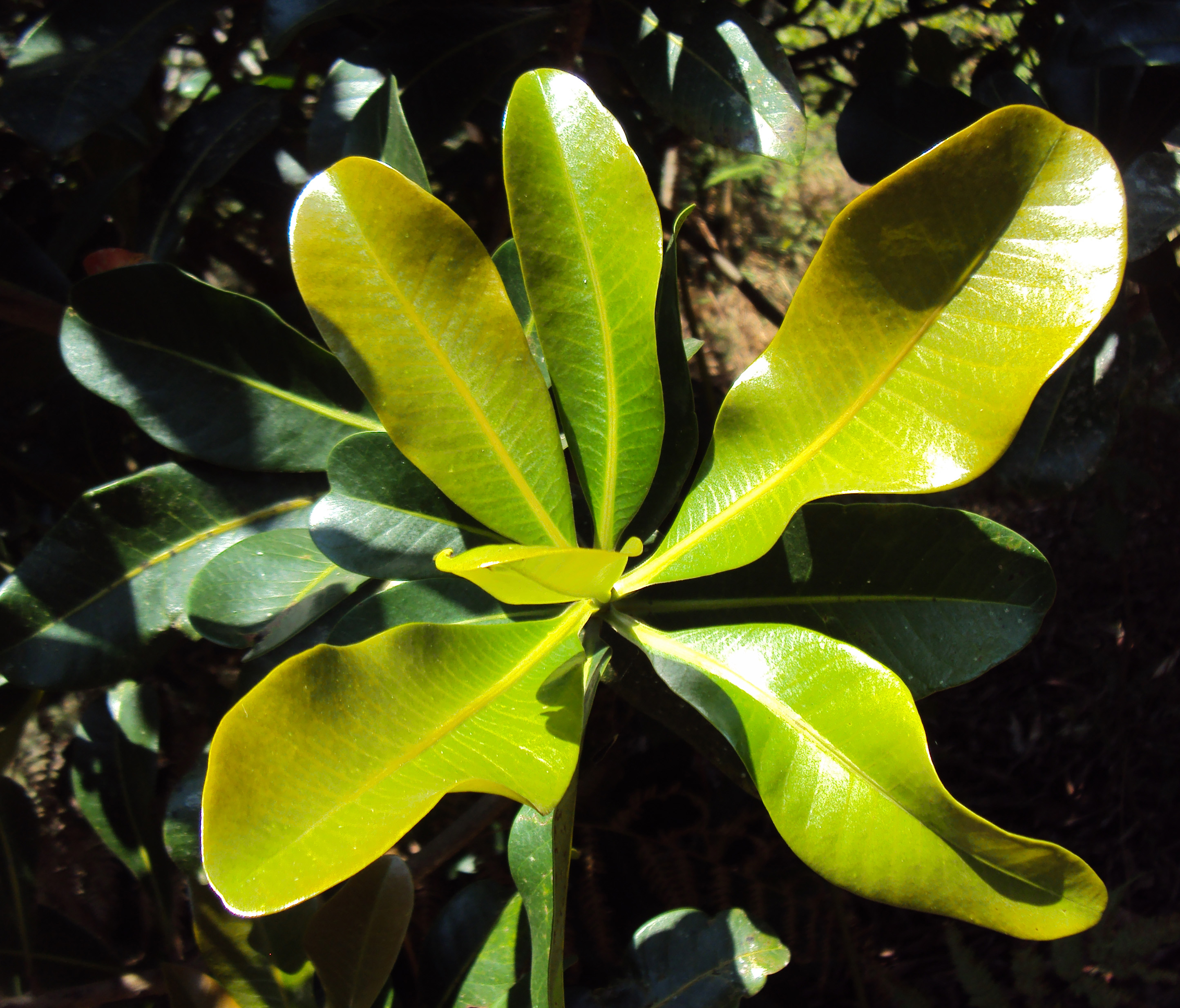
Young leaves maturing

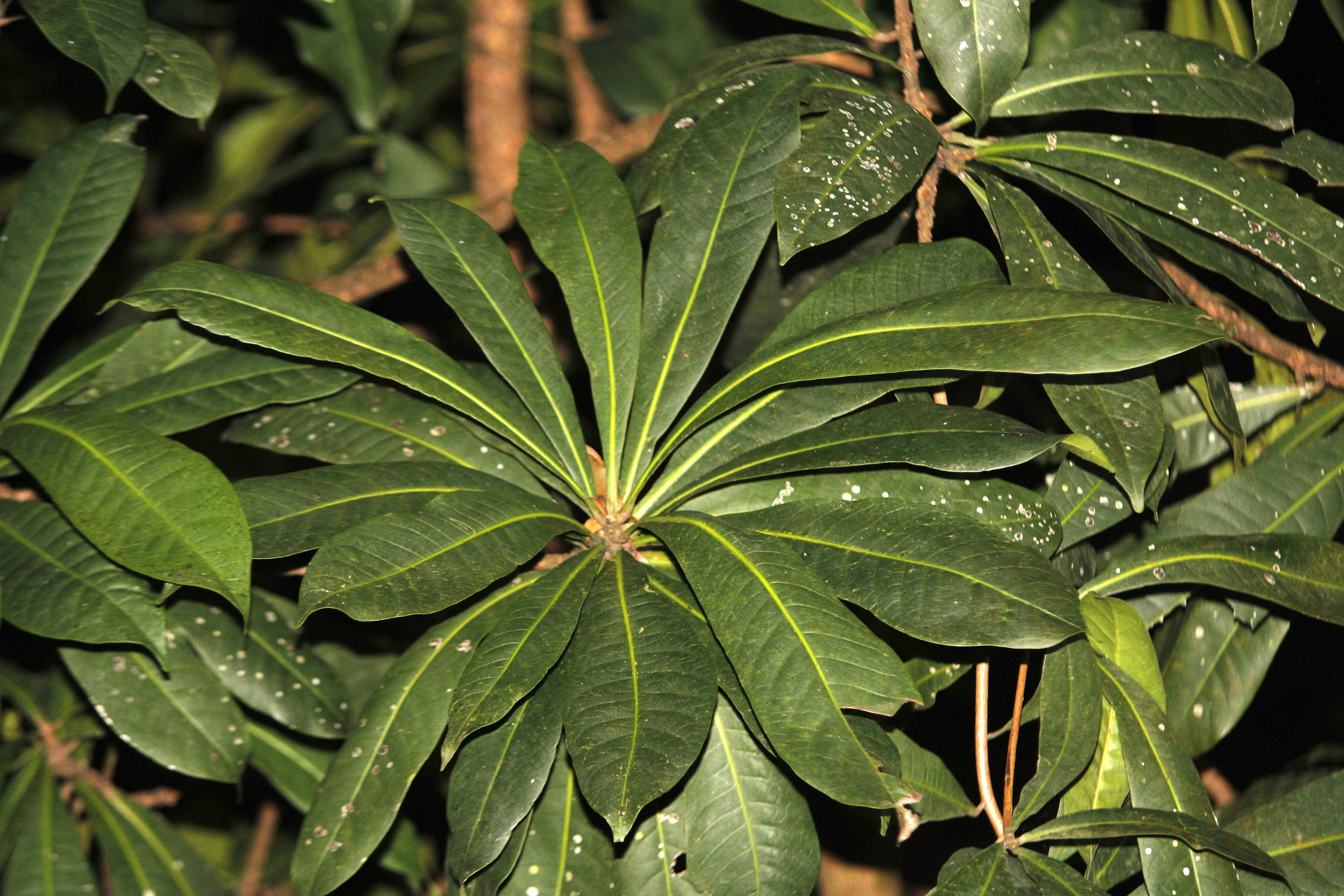
Mature leaves

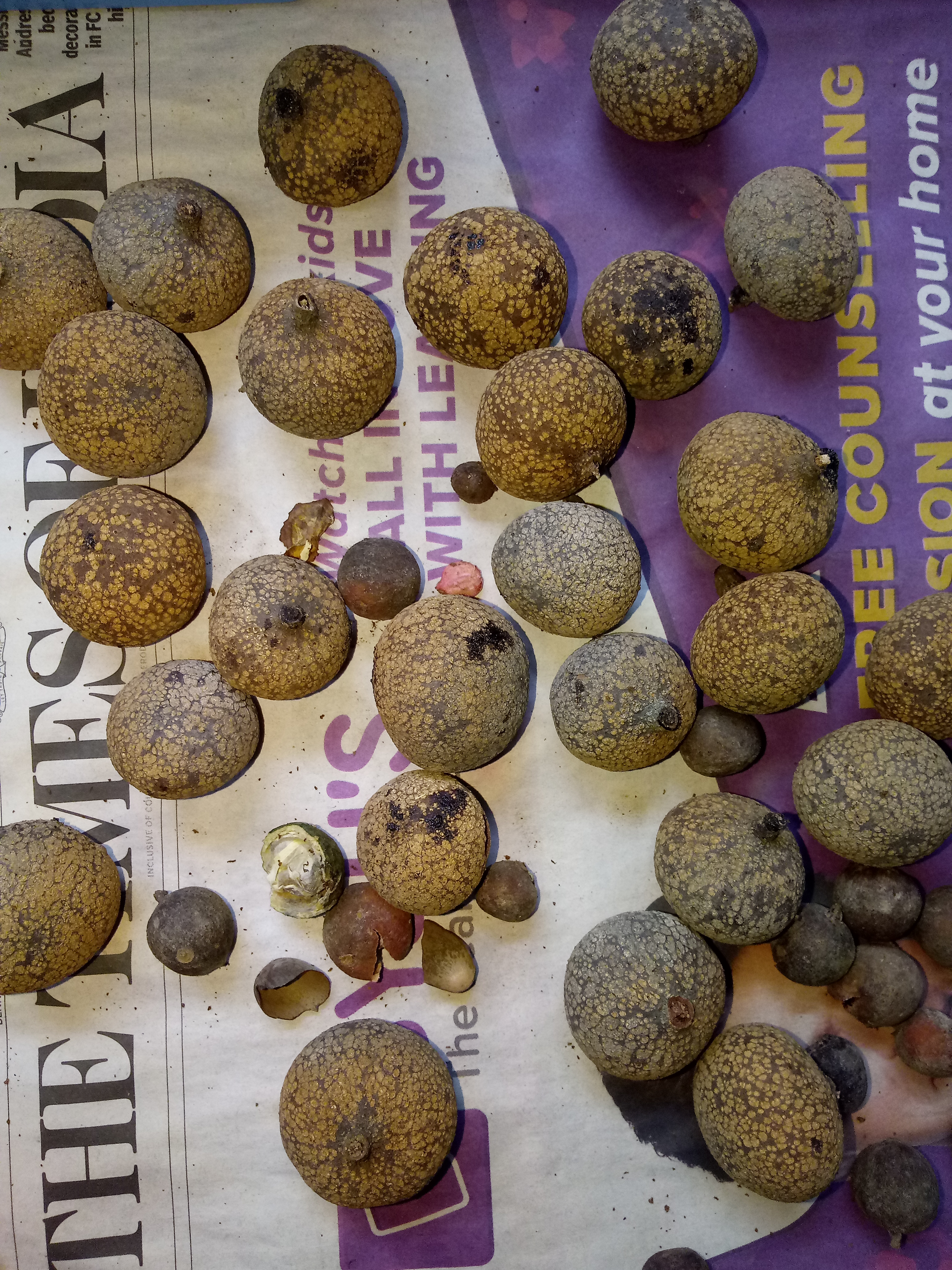
Fruits

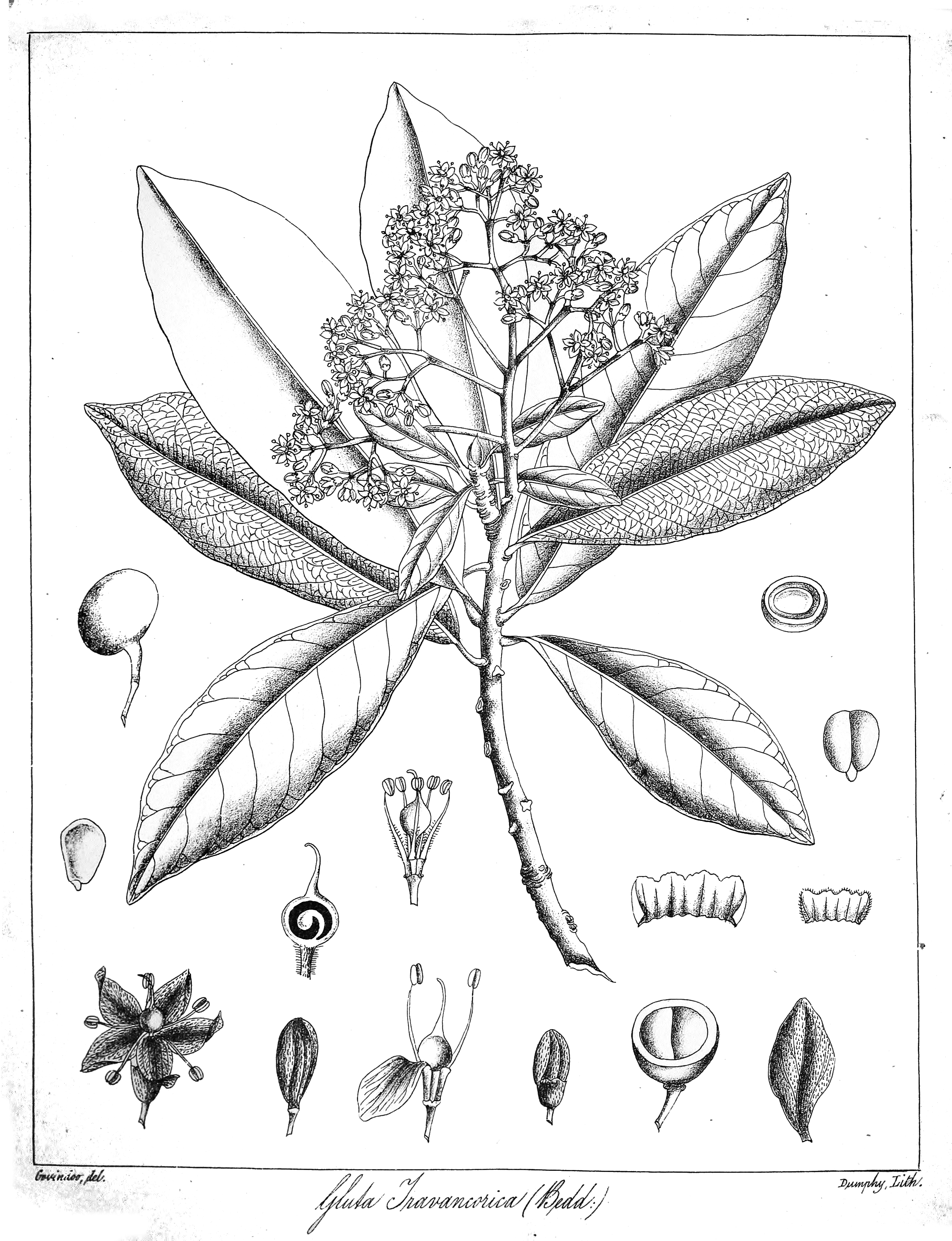
Sketch including flowers
