= Melanochyla fasciculiflora =

Conservation status
- Critically Endangered (IUCN 3.1)

Scientific classification
- Kingdom: Plantae
- Clade: Embryophytes
- Clade: Tracheophytes
- Clade: Angiosperms
- Clade: Eudicots
- Clade: Rosids
- Order: Sapindales
- Family: Anacardiaceae
- Genus: Melanochyla
- Species: M. fasciculiflora

Binomial name
- Melanochyla fasciculiflora Kochummen

Species of flowering plant

Melanochyla fasciculiflora is a species of plant in the family Anacardiaceae. It is endemic to Peninsular Malaysia, where it is confined to the Renggam Forest Reserve in Johor.
