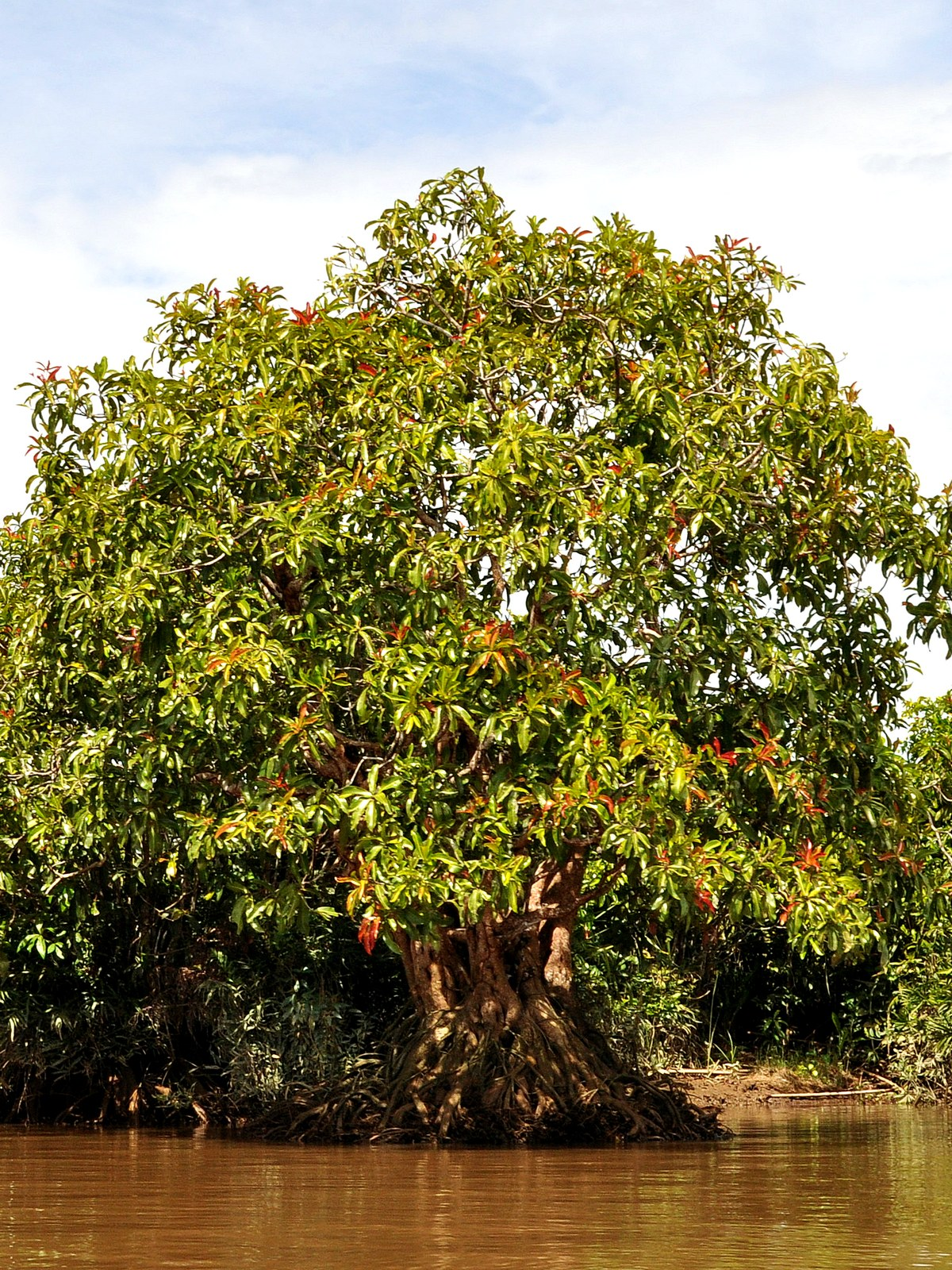

Scientific classification
- Kingdom: Plantae
- Clade: Tracheophytes
- Clade: Angiosperms
- Clade: Eudicots
- Clade: Rosids
- Order: Sapindales
- Family: Anacardiaceae
- Genus: Gluta
- Species: G. velutina

Binomial name
- Gluta velutina Blume

Synonyms
- Gluta coarctata (Griff.) Hook.f.

= Gluta velutina =

Species of flowering plant

Gluta velutina is a plant of tropical Asia in the cashew and sumac family Anacardiaceae. The specific epithet velutina is from the Latin meaning 'velvety', referring to the inflorescences.

== Description ==
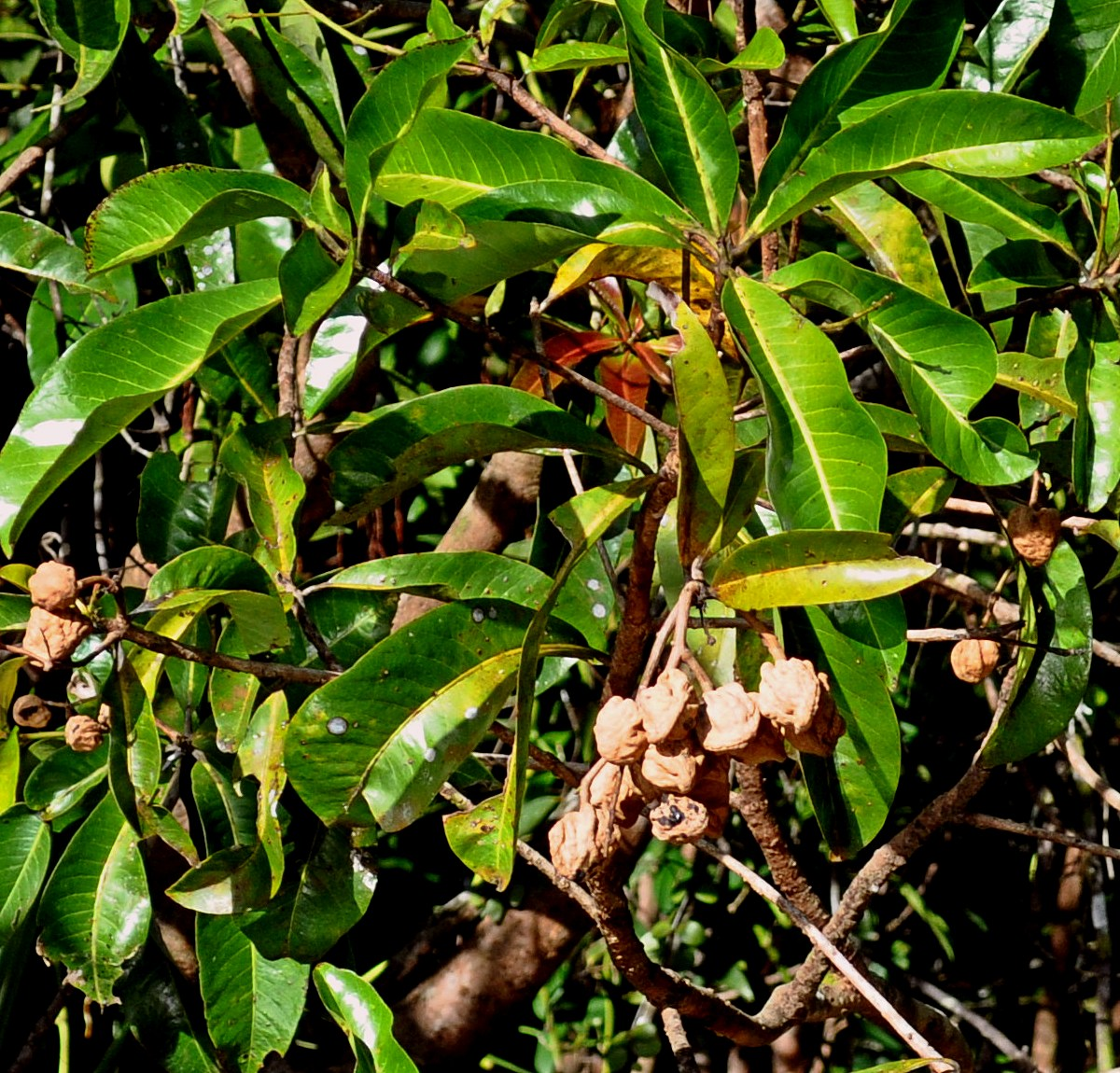
Leaves and fruits

Gluta velutina grows as a shrub or tree up to 7 metres (20 ft) tall, with stilt-roots. Its smooth bark is brownish. The leaves measure up to 19 cm (7 in) long. The flowers are white. Its roundish, pale brown fruits measure up to 7.5 cm (3 in) in diameter. The wood can cause dermatitis and the fruit and leaves are poisonous.

== Distribution and habitat ==
Gluta velutina grows naturally in Burma, Thailand, Vietnam, Sumatra, Peninsular Malaysia, Borneo and Java. Its habitat is tidal rivers and it is often found with the species Barringtonia conoidea and Pandanus helicopus.
