= Gluta cambodiana =

Scientific classification
- Kingdom: Plantae
- Clade: Tracheophytes
- Clade: Angiosperms
- Clade: Eudicots
- Clade: Rosids
- Order: Sapindales
- Family: Anacardiaceae
- Genus: Gluta
- Species: G. cambodiana

Binomial name
- Gluta cambodiana Pierre

Species of flowering plant

Gluta cambodiana is a shrub/small tree in the family Anacardiaceae. It occurs in parts of Mainland Southeast Asia. Its wood is used for pickets and fuel.

== Description, habitat, distribution ==
The species grows as a shrub or a small tree, some 4-10m tall, in secondary formations of Peninsular Malaysia, Thailand, Cambodia and Laos. In central Cambodia, it occurs in the understorey of dry deciduous forest, and has an average wood density of 0.635g/cm^{3}, and a water content of 0.378g/cm^{3}.

== Vernacular names, use ==
In Khmer the taxa is known as kânh chhrôôl, its trunk is often used in Cambodia for pickets, while its twigs are used for firewood. The sap of the plant is an alternative source of lacquer.

== History ==
The French botanist Jean Baptiste Louis Pierre published the taxa in his Flore Forestiere de la Cochinchine in 1897.
