= Melanochyla angustifolia =

Conservation status
- Near Threatened (IUCN 3.1)

Scientific classification
- Kingdom: Plantae
- Clade: Tracheophytes
- Clade: Angiosperms
- Clade: Eudicots
- Clade: Rosids
- Order: Sapindales
- Family: Anacardiaceae
- Genus: Melanochyla
- Species: M. angustifolia

Binomial name
- Melanochyla angustifolia Hook.f.

Species of flowering plant

Melanochyla angustifolia is a flowering plant in the family Anacardiaceae. It is native to Southeast Asia.

== Description ==
Melanochyla angustifolia grows as a tree up to 30 m (100 ft) tall, with a trunk diameter of up to 45 cm (18 in). It has buttresses up to 2.5 m (8 ft) high. The bark is grey to brown to red, normally smooth but may be somewhat cracked. The leathery leaves are obovate to elliptic and measure up to 27.5 cm (11 in) long and to 9 cm (3.5 in) wide. The inflorescences, in panicles, feature yellow flowers. The ellipsoid fruits measure up to 2.5 cm (1 in) long and are yellow when ripe.

== Taxonomy ==
Melanochyla angustifolia was first described by British botanist Joseph Dalton Hooker in 1876 in The flora of British India. The type specimen was collected in Malacca. The specific epithet angustifolia means 'narrow leaf'.

== Distribution and habitat ==
Melanochyla angustifolia is native to Borneo, Peninsular Malaysia and Singapore. Its habitat is in lowland swamps and dipterocarp forests.

== Conservation ==
Melanochyla angustifolia has been assessed as near threatened on the IUCN Red List. The species' habitat is threatened by deforestation and conversion of land for agriculture, especially in its Borneo range. It is not present in any protected areas.
