= Gluta laxiflora =

Scientific classification
- Kingdom: Plantae
- Clade: Tracheophytes
- Clade: Angiosperms
- Clade: Eudicots
- Clade: Rosids
- Order: Sapindales
- Family: Anacardiaceae
- Genus: Gluta
- Species: G. laxiflora

Binomial name
- Gluta laxiflora Ridl.

Species of tree

Gluta laxiflora is a tree of Borneo in the cashew and sumac family Anacardiaceae. The specific epithet laxiflora is from the Latin meaning 'loose flowers', referring to the arrangement of the flowers.

== Description ==
Gluta laxiflora grows as a tree up to 20 metres (70 ft) tall with a trunk diameter of up to 30 cm (12 in). Its dark grey bark is scaly. The large leaves measure up to 19.5 cm (8 in) long. The ellipsoid fruits measure up to 9 cm (4 in) long and are coloured brown or reddish brown.

== Distribution and habitat ==
Gluta laxiflora is endemic to Borneo. Its habitat is lowland mixed dipterocarp forests.
