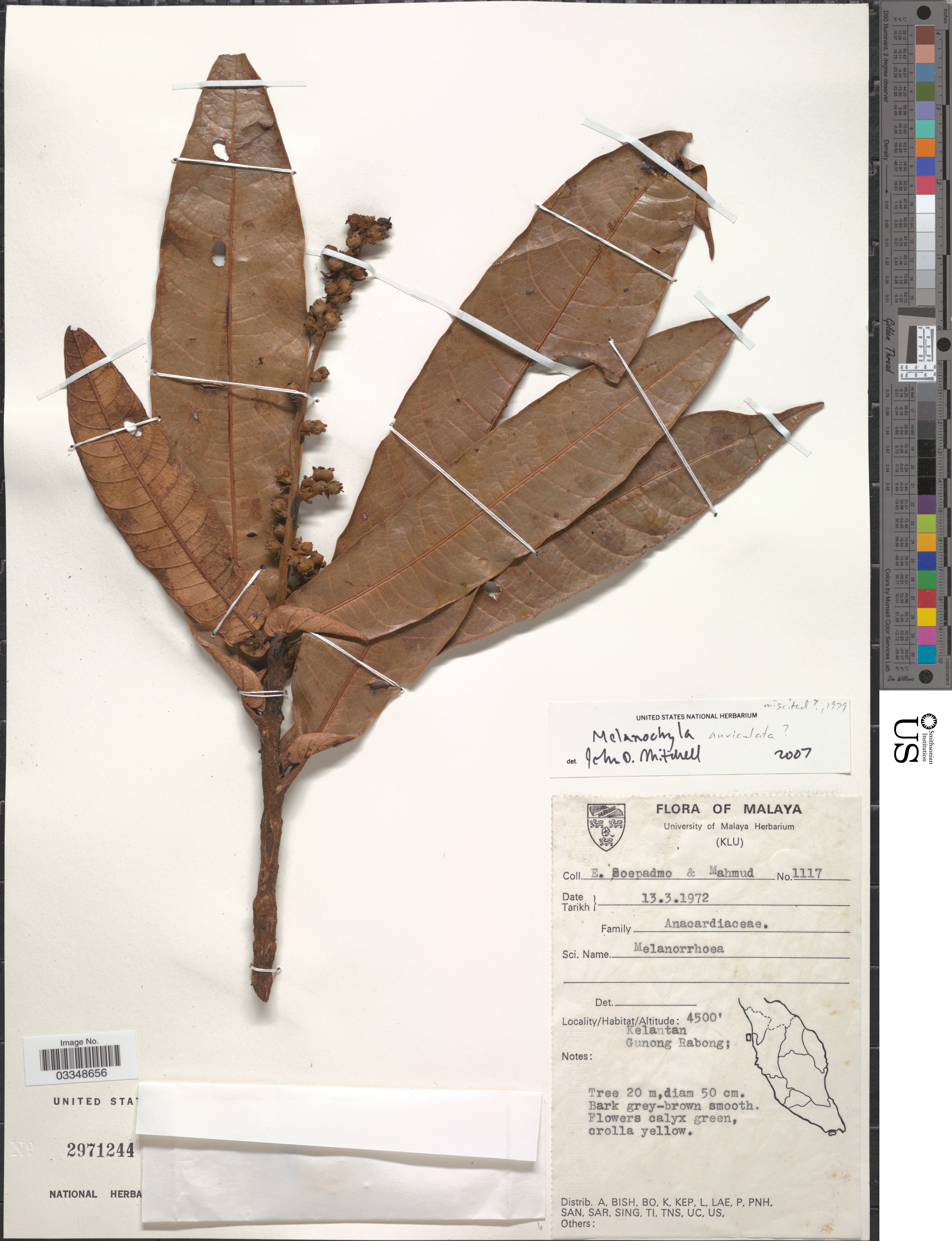
- Melanochyla auriculata specimen from Malaysia

Scientific classification
- Kingdom: Plantae
- Clade: Tracheophytes
- Clade: Angiosperms
- Clade: Eudicots
- Clade: Rosids
- Order: Sapindales
- Family: Anacardiaceae
- Subfamily: Anacardioideae
- Genus: Melanochyla; Hook.f.

= Melanochyla =

Genus of flowering plants

Melanochyla is a genus of plants in the family Anacardiaceae.

== Taxonomy ==
=== Species ===
As of July 2020, Plants of the World Online has 23 accepted species:

- Melanochyla angustifolia Hook.f.
- Melanochyla auriculata Hook.f.
- Melanochyla axillaris Ridl.
- Melanochyla beccariana Oliv.
- Melanochyla borneensis (Ridl.) Ding Hou
- Melanochyla bracteata King
- Melanochyla bullata Ding Hou
- Melanochyla caesia (Blume) Ding Hou
- Melanochyla castaneifolia Ding Hou
- Melanochyla condensata Kochummen
- Melanochyla densiflora King
- Melanochyla elmeri Merr.
- Melanochyla fasciculiflora Kochummen
- Melanochyla fulvinervis (Blume) Ding Hou
- Melanochyla kunstleri King
- Melanochyla longipetiolata Kochummen
- Melanochyla minutiflora Ding Hou
- Melanochyla montana Kochummen
- Melanochyla nitida King
- Melanochyla scalarinervis Kochummen
- Melanochyla semecarpoides Ding Hou
- Melanochyla tomentosa Hook.f.
- Melanochyla woodiana Kochummen
