= Stenaelurillus wandae =

Scientific classification
- Kingdom: Animalia
- Phylum: Arthropoda
- Subphylum: Chelicerata
- Class: Arachnida
- Order: Araneae
- Infraorder: Araneomorphae
- Family: Salticidae
- Genus: Stenaelurillus
- Species: S. wandae

Binomial name
- Stenaelurillus wandae Logunov, 2020

Species of jumping spider

Stenaelurillus wandae is a species of jumping spider in the genus Stenaelurillus that lives in India. It was first described in 2020 by Dmitri Logunov. The spider is medium-sized, with a carapace between 2.95 and 3.35 mm (0.116 and 0.132 in) long and an abdomen between 2.8 and 3.5 mm (0.11 and 0.14 in) long. The female is larger than the male. The colouration differs between them too, with the male having two white stripes on the carapace while the female has a pattern formed of brown and white scales. Its mouthparts such as its chelicerae, the part of its face known as its clypeus, legs and spinnerets are generally yellow, although they may be yellow-brown on the male. The spider is distinguished from others in the area by the lack of a pocket in the epigyne, the external visible part of the copulatory organs of the female and the forked appendage, with different length tines, on the copulatory organs of the male.

== Taxonomy and etymology ==
Stenaelurillus wandae is a species of jumping spider, a member of the family Salticidae, that was first described by the Russian arachnologist Dmitri V. Logunov in 2020. He placed it in the genus Stenaelurillus, first circumscribed by Eugène Simon in 1886. The genus name relates to the name of the genus Aelurillus, which itself derives from the Greek word for cat, with the addition of a Greek stem meaning narrow. The species is named after Wanda Wesołowska, the Polish arachnologist, in celebration of her 70th birthday.

In 2015, Wayne Maddison placed the genus Stenaelurillus in the subtribe Aelurillina in the tribe Aelurillini and listed the tribe in the clade Saltafresia. Two years later, in 2017, it was grouped with nine other genera of jumping spiders by Jerzy Prószyński under the name Aelurillines. The holotype is stored in the Zoological Museum of Moscow University.

== Description ==
The spider is medium-sized. The male has a yellow-brown front section, or carapace, that measures 2.95 mm (0.116 in) in length and 2.05 mm (0.081 in) in width and is covered in scales forming a pattern of two white stripes along the top and yellow bands on the side. The spider's eye field is dark brown. The part of its face known as its clypeus is yellow-brown with white bristles. The underside of the cephalothorax, or sternum, is light yellow, as are its mouthparts, its chelicerae, labium and maxillae.

The male's abdomen measures 2.8 mm (0.11 in) long and 2 mm (0.079 in) wide. It is dark brown on top, has with yellow edging to the rear and greyish-yellow sides, and is light yellow underneath. Its spinnerets are brown and book lung covers are yellow. Its legs are mainly yellow but have a light brown tint and som brown sections.

The male has distinctive copulatory organs. Its pedipalps, sensory organs near its mouth, are light yellow, with a brown tint to some of the extremities. It has a long backward-pointing projection on the side of its palpal tibia, or tibial apophysis, which is distinctively fork-shaped and distinguishes the species from most in the genus. It also has a bulge in the middle of the tibia. At the end of the tibia is an elongated cymbium and, attached to that, a palpal bulb. The bulb consists of an irregularly-shaped tegulum with a large spike at the bottom and a teat-like projection at the top. Behind the latter is a small sharply-curved embolus. The spider is similar to Stenaelurillus furcatus, which also has a long fork-like projection but the tines in this species are different lengths. It also differs from other species in the area by its lack of a fringe on its abdomen.

The female is similar to the male in shape but overall larger. Its yellow carapace is 3.35 mm (0.132 in) long and 2.28 mm (0.090 in) wide and covered with brown and white scales. Its eye field is dark brown, the remaining part being whitish-brown and lacking any patter, Its clypeus is yellow and covered in fine white hairs. Its sternum and its mouthparts are all light yellow. Its abdomen has a length of 3.5 in (89 mm) and width of 2.8 mm (0.11 in). It is brown on top with a pattern of yellow patches and spots. Underneath, it is yellow with a scattering of brown freckles. Its book lung covers are light yellow and pedipalps a slightly darker yellow. Its spinnerets and legs and all yellow with a hint of brown.

The female also has distinctive copulatory organs. Its epigyne, the external visible part of its copulatory structure, is flat and has no pocket. There are two round copulatory openings that are very close to each other. Its has short insemination ducts, at the same depth as they are wide at the opening. The spider is unusual amongst Stenaelurillus species found in the region in that it lacks an epigynal pocket.

== Distribution ==
Stenaelurillus spiders are found throughout Africa, Asia and Europe, across both the Afrotropical and Palearctic realms. They are particularly common in West Africa, the south-eastern part of Central Africa and South Asia.. Stenaelurillus wandae is endemic to India. The holotype was identified based on a specimen collected in Odisha in 2014. The species was subsequently also found to live in Bihar.
