= Gluta aptera =

Conservation status
- Least Concern (IUCN 3.1)

Scientific classification
- Kingdom: Plantae
- Clade: Tracheophytes
- Clade: Angiosperms
- Clade: Eudicots
- Clade: Rosids
- Order: Sapindales
- Family: Anacardiaceae
- Genus: Gluta
- Species: G. aptera

Binomial name
- Gluta aptera (King) Ding Hou

Synonyms
- Melanorrhoea aptera King; Melanorrhoea inappendiculata King; Melanorrhoea tricolor Ridl.

Species of flowering plant

Gluta aptera is a plant in the family Anacardiaceae. It is native to Southeast Asia.

== Description ==
Gluta aptera grows as a tree up to 30 m (100 ft) tall with a trunk diameter of up to 70 cm (28 in). The smooth bark is brown to grey. The leathery leaves are obovate and measure up to 19 cm (7 in) long and up to 8.5 cm (3 in) wide. The flowers are white. The roundish fruits are brown and measure up to 3.5 cm (1.4 in) wide.

== Taxonomy ==
Gluta aptera was first described as Melanorrhoea aptera by British botanist George King in 1896 in the Journal of the Asiatic Society of Bengal. In 1978, Dutch botanist Ding Hou transferred the species to the genus Gluta. Type specimens were collected in Perak and Penang in Peninsular Malaysia. The specific epithet aptera means 'without wing', referring to the fruit.

== Distribution and habitat ==
Gluta aptera is native to Sumatra, Peninsular Malaysia and Borneo. Its habitat is in lowland and montane forests, including in swamps, at elevations of 700–1,200 m (2,000–4,000 ft).

== Conservation ==
Gluta aptera has been assessed as least concern on the IUCN Red List. However, the species' habitat is threatened by deforestation and conversion of land for agricultural and urban development purposes. The species is present in numerous protected areas.

== Uses ==
The timber of Gluta aptera is locally used in home construction. It is also used as a dye.
