= Shendurney Wildlife Sanctuary =

Wildlife sanctuary in India

- IUCN category IV (habitat/species management area)
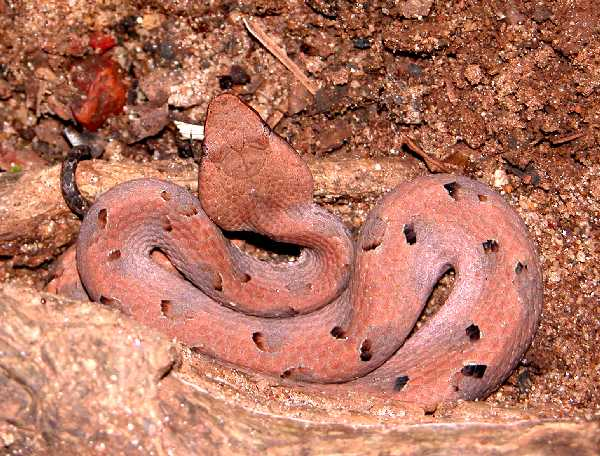
- Hump Nosed Viper (Hypnale hypnale) at Shendurney WLS, Kollam district, Kerala, India.

- Location within Kerala Location within India
- Interactive map of Shendurney Wildlife Sanctuary
- Location: Western Ghats, Kollam, India
- Nearest city: Kollam - 75 km Trivandrum - 80 km
- Coordinates: 8°51′31″N 77°12′38″E
- Length: 23 kilometres (14 mi)
- Area: 172.403 km^{2} (66.565 sq mi)
- Elevation: 1,169 m (3,835 ft)
- Established: 25 June 1984 (42 years ago)
- Website: Shendurney Wildlife Sanctuary

Shendurney Wildlife Sanctuary is a protected area in the Western Ghats, India, located in Kollam district of Kerala and comes under the control of the Agasthyamalai Biosphere Reserve. It was established on 25 August 1984 and comprises 172.403 square kilometres (66.565 sq mi). The name is a corruption of the Chengurinji, a tree endemic to the region (Gluta travancorica). Tropical evergreen and semi-evergreen forest cover a major area of the sanctuary. The sanctuary has an artificial lake of nearly 18.69Sq.km size and also surrounded by the reservoir of Thenmala Dam. The Shendurney Wildlife Sanctuary is a treasure house of plant diversity. About 1257 species of flowering plants belonging to more than 150 families are reported from this sanctuary of which 309 species are endemic to Western Ghats. Birds from 267 species including migratory, endemic and endangered species have been reported here. It has a presence of lion-tailed macaque, a highly endangered species.

A brood of the highly elusive nocturnal forest bird, the Great Eared Nightjar was spotted for the first time at Shendurney Wildlife Sanctuary in Kollam, Kerala. Earlier, it was recorded from the Siruvani foothills in Tamil Nadu in May 1995. The Great Eared Nightjar (Eurostopodus macrotis bourdilloni) belongs to the nightjar family. It gets its name from the two erect earlike tufts of feathers on its head, behind the eyes).

The first eco-tourism project in India, Thenmala Eco-tourism Project has been formulated in and around Shenduruney Wildlife Sanctuary.

Another unique aspect of the Shendurnani Sanctuary is that there is no sandalwood trees here.
