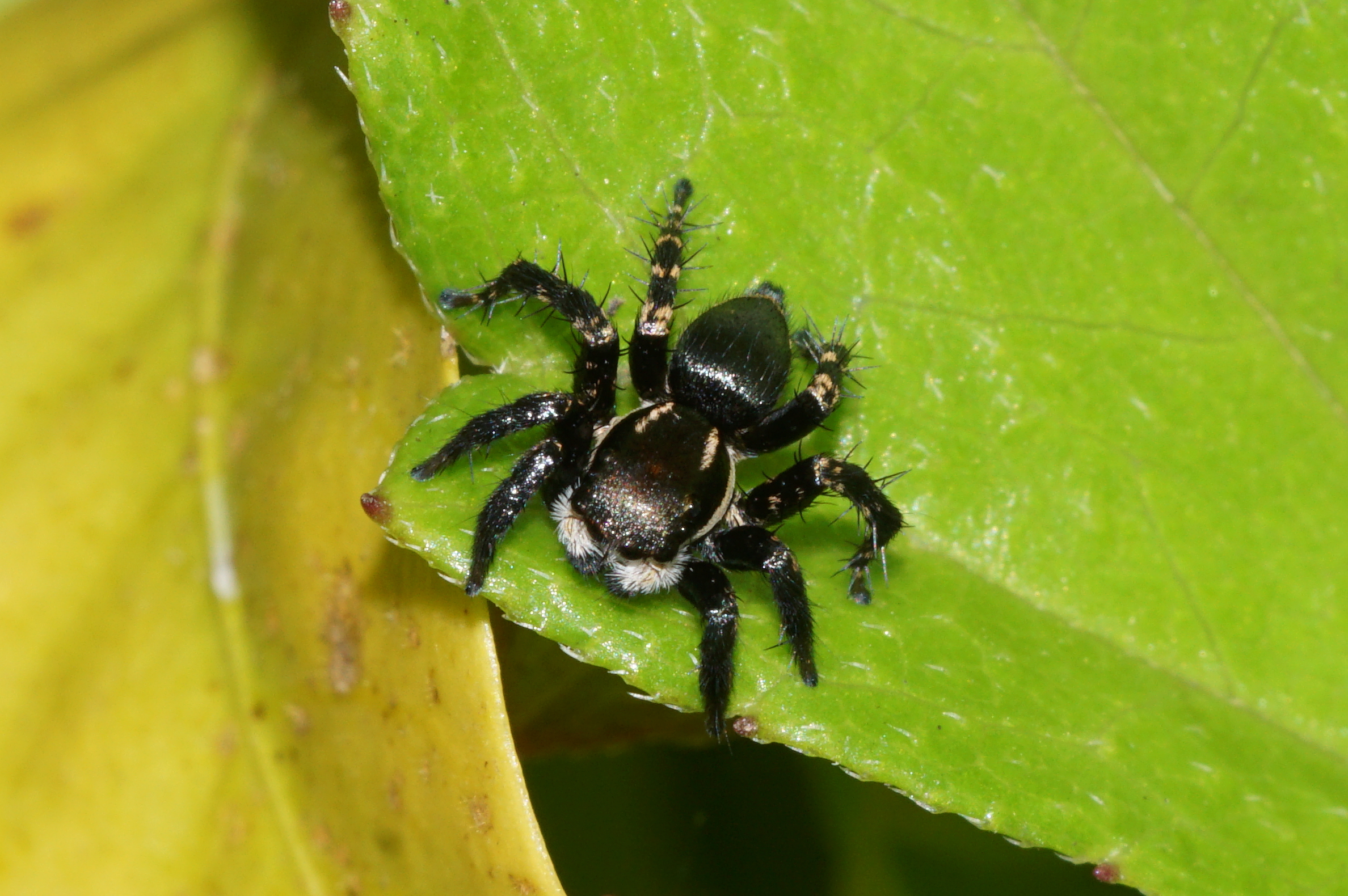

Scientific classification
- Kingdom: Animalia
- Phylum: Arthropoda
- Subphylum: Chelicerata
- Class: Arachnida
- Order: Araneae
- Infraorder: Araneomorphae
- Family: Salticidae
- Genus: Stenaelurillus
- Species: S. albus

Binomial name
- Stenaelurillus albus Sebastian, Sankaran, Malamel & Joseph, 2015

= Stenaelurillus albus =

Species of spider

Stenaelurillus albus is a species of jumping spider in the genus Stenaelurillus that lives in India. It was first described in 2015 by Pothalil A. Sebastian, Pradeep M. Sankaran, Jobi J. Malamel and Mathew M. Joseph. The spider was first found in Kerala but has also been observed in Karnataka, including the Mookambika Wildlife Sanctuary and Parambikulam Tiger Reserve. It prefers to live in the leaf litter found in deciduous forests. It is medium-sized, with a body length that ranges from 4.61 to 6.82 mm (0.181 to 0.269 in). The female is larger than the male. The female has a black oval cephalothorax which has a pattern of yellow bands and an oval abdomen that has yellow patches, the most pronounced three of which make a triangle shape, on a black background. The male differs in having a shiny black abdomen which has no patterns and a cephalothorax that is black with thick white stripes that mark the spider from front to back. This pattern distinguishes the species from others in the genus, including Stenaelurillus belihuloya. The sexual organs are also distinctive. The male has a brown palpal bulb that has two creamy-white markings on the rear and has a short, blunt embolus. These areas give the spider its name, from the Latin for white. The female has wide copulatory openings and small C-shaped spermathecae, and it is the latter that enables it to be distinguished from Stenaelurillus abramovi.

== Taxonomy ==
Stenaelurillus albus was first described by Pothalil A. Sebastian, Pradeep M. Sankaran, Jobi J. Malamel and Mathew M. Joseph in 2015. They placed the species in the genus Stenaelurillus, first raised by Eugène Simon in 1886. The name relates to the genus name Aelurillus, which itself derives from the Greek word for cat, with the addition of a Greek stem meaning narrow. The genus was placed in the subtribe Aelurillina in the tribe Aelurillini in the clade Saltafresia by Wayne Maddison in the same year that the species was first described. Two years later, in 2017, it was grouped with nine other genera of jumping spiders under the name Aelurillines. Like other Asian species in the genus and unlike those found in Africa, the sexual organs seem to have a distinctive structural origin, particularly the tegulum. The species name is the Latin word for white and relates to the distinctive colour of part of the tegulum at the rear of the male palpal bulb.

== Description ==
The spider is medium-sized. The male has a body length that varies between 4.61 and 5.89 mm (0.181 and 0.232 in). The black cephalothorax is an oval that typically measures 2.98 mm (0.117 in) in length and 2.08 mm (0.082 in) in width. It has two white thick stripes that stretch from the front to the back, another weaker one that marks the spider from side to side, and two more bands on the thorax. The abdomen is also oval, typically 2.91 mm (0.115 in) long and 1.98 mm (0.078 in) wide, and uniformly shiny black. The eye field is similarly black with hairs around the rearmost eyes. The clypeus is also covered in hairs. The chelicerae are short, vertical and brown, with one large and one small tooth at the fore and another behind, while the fangs are short. The legs are generally yellow, although there are areas with other colours and the hairs are black. The pedipalps are yellow and hairy. The spider has a brown palpal bulb that has two creamy-white areas at the back where the tegulum is found. The embolus is short, blunt and curves towards the front of the spider.

The female is very similar to the male in colouration and shape. It is slightly larger, measuring between 5.43 and 6.82 mm (0.214 and 0.269 in) in body length. It has a larger cephalothorax, typically 2.997 mm (0.1180 in) long and 2.29 mm (0.090 in) wide, that is black with dull yellow bands that cross the back and two strikes that extend back from the thorax. The abdomen, which can be 3.83 in (97 mm) long and 2.84 mm (0.112 in) wide, is also black but three pronounced yellow patches that make the shape of a triangle and several others which are duller. The clypeus and eye field are similar but the chelicerae are yellow and the legs more dull yellow, with black patches, than the male. The epigyne is small, with wide copulatory openings and small C-shaped spermathecae. The species has a distinctive mating plug, which covers the entire left copulatory opening and surrounding part of the epigyne.

Stenaelurillus albus is very similar to many other species in the genus. The spider is similar to Stenaelurillus abramovi in the size of the copulatory openings but size and shape of the spermathecae enable the two be differentiated. The species can be distinguished from Stenaelurillus arambagensis by the shape of the embolus and the shape of the spermathecae. More obviously, it can be told apart from Stenaelurillus belihuloya by the presence of the lateral stripe, variety of colours in the pedipalps and the shape of the embolus. It differs from Stenaelurillus shwetamukhi in the lack of patterns on the male abdomen and the narrowness and bluntness of the embolus.

== Distribution and habitat ==
The spider is endemic to India. The species was first identified in the Ernakulam district of Kerala based on a collection of fifteen examples, the holotype and six other males plus eight females. The species has subsequently seen near Bhoothathankettu and in the Kodanad elephant training centre, Neyyar Wildlife Sanctuary, Parambikulam Tiger Reserve and Shendurney Wildlife Sanctuary in Kerala. It was also found on the campus of Kuvempu University and the Mookambika Wildlife Sanctuary in Karnataka. The spider is restricted in its range to south India. The spider lives in rocky areas in deciduous forests, preferred to live in leaf litter.
