= Blumea (journal) =

- Discipline: Botany
- Language: English

Publication details
- History: 1934–present
- Publisher: National Herbarium of the Netherlands (Netherlands)
- Frequency: Triannual

Standard abbreviations
- ISO 4: Blumea

Indexing
- ISSN: 0006-5196

Links
- Website

Blumea - Journal of Plant Taxonomy and Plant Geography (Tijdschrift voor de Systematiek en de Geografie der Planten in Dutch) is a peer-reviewed journal of botany published by the National Herbarium of the Netherlands.

Except for a short period during World War II, Blumea has been published continuously since 1934. It deals with the taxonomy, morphology, anatomy, biogeography, and ecology of spermatophytes and cryptogams native to Southeast Asia, sub-Saharan Africa (excluding South Africa), and South America. Blumea is published three times a year, with each issue numbering around 600 pages.
