= Ding Hou =

Dutch botanist

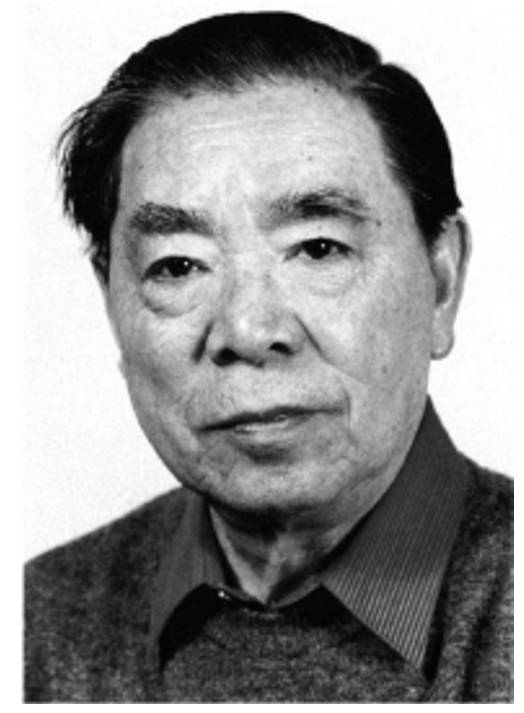
- Born: 11 October 1921; Hsingkan, Jiangxi, China
- Died: 9 September 2008 (aged 86); Leiden, Netherlands
- Known for: Flora Malesiana, plant collections
- Scientific career
- Fields: Botany
- Workplaces: National Herbarium of the Netherlands, Arnold Arboretum, Missouri Botanical Garden
- Doctoral advisor: Robert E. Woodson

Ding Hou (11 October 1921, Hsingkan, Jiangxi, China – 9 September 2008, Leiden, Netherlands) was a Dutch botanist and mycologist.

== Education and career ==
In 1945, Hou obtained a botany degree from the National Chung Cheng University in Jiangxi, becoming a botanical assistant there on graduation. From 1947 to 1951 he was a botanical assistant at the National Taiwan University in Taipei. He obtained a master's degree and PhD from Washington University in St. Louis in 1952 and 1955 respectively. During this time he also worked for the Missouri Botanical Garden. In 1955 he became a botanist at the Arnold Arboretum at Harvard University. In 1956, he was hired by Professor Cornelis van Steenis at the National Herbarium of the Netherlands, working on the Flora Malesiana project. He worked at the National Herbarium until his retirement in 1986.

Hou has made significant contributions to the plant families Anacardiaceae, Anisophylleaceae, Aristolochiaceae, Celastraceae, Rhizophoraceae, Thymelaeaceae and later to Leguminosae. He named over 100 plant species, including Anisophyllea corneri, Bruguiera exaristata and Gluta sabahana. The species Aristolochia dinghoui, Parishia dinghouiana and Thottea dinghoui are named for him.
