= Stenaelurillus darwini =

Scientific classification
- Kingdom: Animalia
- Phylum: Arthropoda
- Subphylum: Chelicerata
- Class: Arachnida
- Order: Araneae
- Infraorder: Araneomorphae
- Family: Salticidae
- Genus: Stenaelurillus
- Species: S. darwini

Binomial name
- Stenaelurillus darwini Wesolowska & Russell-Smith, 2000

Species of spider

Stenaelurillus darwini is a species of jumping spider in the genus Stenaelurillus, found in Tanzania and Kenya. It has been found across a range of environments, from bushland to montane grasslands and forests. During a survey in Tanzania's Mkomazi National Park it was noted as more common than many other ground-active jumping spiders. It is a medium-sized spider typically between 5.15 and 6.75 mm (0.203 and 0.266 in) in body length, with the females larger than the males. They have brown or dark brown thoraxes with four white stripes running down their length, two along the back and one on each side and the males have a distinctive dark brown abdomen with a central small white arrow or diamond. The females' reproductive organs are very uncommon in having "flaps" over their copulatory openings. The spider was first described in 2000 and given the species name darwini after Charles Darwin and the assistance provided by the Darwin Initiative to the study by Wanda Wesołowska and Anthony Russell-Smith.

== Taxonomy and etymology ==
S. darwini is a jumping spider in the family Salticidae and was first described by Wanda Wesołowska and Anthony Russell-Smith in 2000 as part of a larger survey of invertebrates in the Mkomazi Game Reserve in Tanzania. Prior to its description, the spider was identified as a unique but unknown new species of spider in the genus Stenaelurillus by Jerzy Prószyński in 1981. Its genus was classified as part of the subtribe Aelurillina in tribe Aelurillini by Wayne Maddison's in his 2015 phylogenetic classification of the Salticidae family, in addition to placing them into the unranked clade Salticoida as part of the subfamily Salticinae.

Its species name darwini was chosen in honour of Charles Darwin and as a form of acknowledgement of the assistance provided by the Darwin Initiative to the wider survey.

== Description ==
The spider is medium-sized and whilst not as dramatic as with other species of spiders, S. darwini exhibits characteristics of sexual dimorphism common in its genus, with the two genders having noticeable differences in size and colouration but with a similar overall body shape.

The female spider is about 1.60 mm (0.063 in) larger than the male, with an overall length of about 6.75 mm (0.266 in) consisting of a cephalothorax 3.00 mm (0.118 in) long and 2.30 mm (0.091 in) wide and an abdomen 3.75 mm (0.148 in) long and 2.80 mm (0.110 in) wide. Whereas the male has an overall length of 5.15 mm (0.203 in) with a cephalothorax 2.65 mm (0.104 in) long and 1.90 mm (0.075 in) wide and an abdomen 2.50 mm (0.098 in) long and 1.85 mm (0.073 in) wide.

They both have brown carapaces, but the female's is notably lighter in colour. The male's eye field is black and the female's is dark brown, and whilst their legs are both a yellow brown, the female's are lighter.

The clearest difference is in the colouration of the abdomen. The male has a hardened part of its exoskeleton, known as a scutum, covering the first two thirds of it that is dark brown in colour with a small white diamond/arrow in the middle of it. The rest of the abdomen is covered in brown hairs with white hairs at its sides and end and a white underside. Its spinnerets are whitish with a brown hue and dark tips. The first half of the female's abdomen is brown, and the second half is a darker brown with a top-centred, large yellowish triangle flanked by two small white spots and one larger spot at its tip close to the end of the abdomen. The underneath and sides of the abdomen are yellow with brown spots and the spinnerets are yellow with a brown hue.

Both genders have four white stripes running down the length of their thorax, two along the back and one on each side, the rest of their bodies are generally a yellow or brownish yellow colour with the female being slightly lighter in tone.

The female's reproductive organs have an unusual characteristic for the genus, where their two copulatory openings have dome-shaped "flaps" made from chitin which were considered to be unique until Stenaelurillus termitophagus was reclassified into the genus. Their internal structure however is unremarkable consisting of short insemination ducts and S-shaped spermathecae.

=== Similarities and differences to other Stenaelurillus spiders ===
S. darwini spiders bear the closest similarities to Stenaelurillus fuscatus and Stenaelurillus uniguttatus. The males can be told apart from these species by the tuft of long black bristles on the apophysis on the back of the pedipalp tibia as well as the shape of the tegulum. For other males in its genus the colouring and pattern of their abdomen can also be used to tell them apart. Notably Stenaelurillus specularis has similar palps but they can be differentiated as S. darwini has narrower apophyses on its tibia and longer lobes on the rear of the palpal bulb.

The females' distinctive domed "flaps" on the epigyne and "basket" shaped spermathecae allow them to be told apart from other spiders which commonly have depressions in the epigyne. Female S. darwini are visually similar S. fuscatus but can be distinguished from them by their narrower insemination ducts.

== Distribution and habitat ==
S. darwini's distribution is limited to Kenya and Tanzania. Its holotype and accompanying paratypes were found in Mkomazi National Park in Tanzania taken from pitfall traps set in grassland. They were trapped in 1994 and were chosen from a number of specimens of the spider found between 1993 and 1997 as part of the survey of invertebrates in the reserve, they are now held at the Royal Museum for Central Africa in Belgium. The spiders were observed in large numbers in the reserve, with Stenaelurillus mirabilis being the only other species of ground-active jumping spider seen more often during the survey. They were found year round across a diverse range of environments with their numbers swelling in the eastern commiphora and acacia bushland during the wet season and in the Spirostachys forest and grassland of the western mountains during the summer dry season.

Examples of the spider have also been found in Kenya, with the first documented by Jerzy Prószyński in 1981 based on a specimen found in 1970 on Diani Beach. Further examples of the spider have been found at Kwale and through the use of pitfall traps at Jora Village next to Mt. Kasigau in Taita–Taveta County and at the Taita Discovery Centre in Tsavo.
