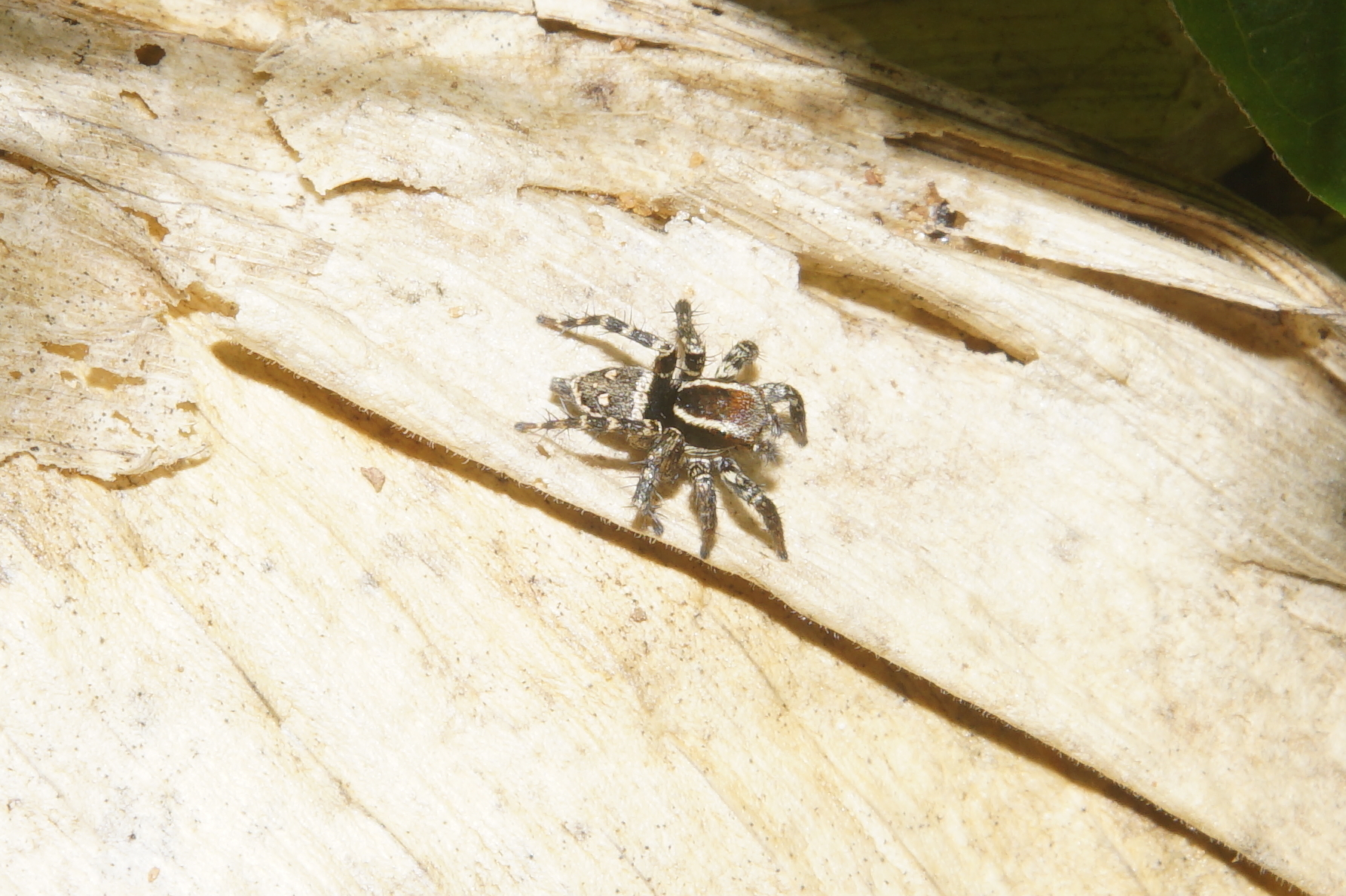
- A spider of the Stenaelurillus genus

Scientific classification
- Kingdom: Animalia
- Phylum: Arthropoda
- Subphylum: Chelicerata
- Class: Arachnida
- Order: Araneae
- Infraorder: Araneomorphae
- Family: Salticidae
- Genus: Stenaelurillus
- Species: S. pseudoguttatus

Binomial name
- Stenaelurillus pseudoguttatus Logunov & Azarkina, 2018

= Stenaelurillus pseudoguttatus =

Species of spider

Stenaelurillus pseudoguttatus is a species of jumping spider in the genus Stenaelurillus that lives in Namibia. The species was first described in 2018 by Dmitri Logunov and Galina Azarkina. The holotype had originally been described by Wanda Wesołowska and Meg S. Cumming in 2002 and allocated to the genus Mashonarus guttatus but was recognised as a new species 16 years later. Stenaelurillus pseudoguttatus takes its name from the fact that it had previously been named in the type series of this other species, now named Stenaelurillus guttatus. Only the male has been identified. The spider is medium-sized, with a carapace 2.28 mm (0.090 in) long and an abdomen 2.05 mm (0.081 in) long. The carapace is yellow-brown and has two white stripes, while the abdomen is a dark brown with six white spots. It can be distinguished from both Stenaelurillus brandbergensis and Stenaelurillus guttatus by its long sword-like embolus.

== Taxonomy ==
Mashonarus guttatus was first described by Wanda Wesołowska and Meg S. Cumming in 2002. It is one of over 500 species identified by the Polish arachnologist Wesołowska. It was initially placed in the genus Mashonarus, which was created at the same time, as the type species. The genus name was derived from Mashonaland, the area where it was first found. The spiders in the genus were medium-sized, between 4.2 and 7.0 mm (0.17 and 0.28 in) in length, and were differentiated by their sexual organs. At the time, the species was seen as very similar to Stenaelurillus, particularly in the structure of the epigyne and the shield-like shape of and patterns on the abdomen.

In 2018, the spider was moved to Stenaelurillus by Dmitri Logunov and Galina N. Azarkina. At the same time, a male paratype was recognised as a new species, Stenaelurillus pseudoguttatus. Stenaelurillus had been first raised by Eugène Simon in 1885. The genus name relates to the genus name Aelurillus, which itself derives from the Greek word for cat, with the addition of a Greek stem meaning narrow. It was placed in the subtribe Aelurillina in the tribe Aelurillini in the clade Saltafresia by Wayne Maddison in 2015. Two years later, in 2017, it was grouped with nine other genera of jumping spiders under the name Aelurillines. The species name is derived from the Greek word pseudo, meaning false, and the Latin word guttatus, which can be translated speckled. The first part recalls the way that the species was originally found in the type series of another species. The second part recalls the distinctive pattern of colours that can be seen on the species.

== Description ==
Only the male has been described. The spider is medium-sized and has an overall shape that is typical for the genus.The carapace, typically 2.28 mm (0.090 in) long and 1.63 mm (0.064 in) wide, is yellow-brown and has two white stripes which stretch from the front to the back. The dark brown abdomen is marked by three pairs of white spots and is 2.05 mm (0.081 in) long and 1.38 mm (0.054 in) wide. The spinnerets are greyish yellow and the chelicerae yellowish brown, as are the pedipalps. The clypeus and legs are yellow. The eye field is black. The embolus is long and sword-like with a wide base. It is the embolus that most distinguishes the species from the related Stenaelurillus brandbergensis and Stenaelurillus guttatus.

== Distribution ==
The species is endemic to Namibia. The holotype was found near the Okavango River near Rundu in 1979. It is known only from that local area.
