= Tisanibainepta =

Scientific classification
- Kingdom: Animalia
- Phylum: Arthropoda
- Subphylum: Chelicerata
- Class: Arachnida
- Order: Araneae
- Infraorder: Araneomorphae
- Family: Salticidae
- Genus: Tisanibainepta; Logunov, 2020

Type species
- Tisaniba bijibijan (Zhang & Maddison, 2014)

Species
- 6, see text

Genus of jumping spiders

Tisanibainepta is a genus of southeast Asian jumping spiders first described by Dmitri V. Logunov in 2020. It includes three newly described species and three split from Tisaniba with several distinctions, including the embolus shape and the median septum present on the epigynum.

== Species ==
As of April 2022 it contains six species:

- T. bijibijan (Zhang & Maddison, 2014) (type) – Malaysia (Borneo)
- T. kubah (Zhang & Maddison, 2014) – Malaysia (Borneo)
- T. pahang Logunov, 2020 – Malaysia (Peninsula)
- T. palawan Logunov, 2020 – Philippines (Palawan)
- T. selasi (Zhang & Maddison, 2014) – Malaysia (Borneo)
- T. silvatica Logunov, 2020 – Philippines (Palawan)

== See also ==
- Tisaniba
- List of Salticidae genera
