= Paraeuophrys =

Scientific classification
- Kingdom: Animalia
- Phylum: Arthropoda
- Subphylum: Chelicerata
- Class: Arachnida
- Order: Araneae
- Infraorder: Araneomorphae
- Family: Salticidae
- Genus: Paraeuophrys; Logunov, 2020

Type species
- P. sumatrana Logunov, 2020

Species
- Paraeuophrys bryophila (Berry, Beatty & Prószyński, 1996); Paraeuophrys sumatrana Logunov, 2020

Genus of jumping spiders

Paraeuophrys is a small genus of jumping spiders first described by Dmitri V. Logunov in 2020. As of April 2022 it contains only two species native to Fiji and Sumatra, respectively: P. bryophila and P. sumatrana.

== See also ==
- Euophrys
- List of Salticidae genera
