= Thaiattus =

Scientific classification
- Kingdom: Animalia
- Phylum: Arthropoda
- Subphylum: Chelicerata
- Class: Arachnida
- Order: Araneae
- Infraorder: Araneomorphae
- Family: Salticidae
- Genus: Thaiattus; Logunov, 2020
- Species: T. krabi

Binomial name
- Thaiattus krabi Logunov, 2020

Genus of jumping spiders

Thaiattus is a monotypic genus of southeast Asian jumping spiders containing the single species, Thaiattus krabi. It was first described by Dmitri V. Logunov in 2020, and it has only been found in Thailand.

== See also ==
- List of Salticidae genera
