= Microemathis =

Scientific classification
- Kingdom: Animalia
- Phylum: Arthropoda
- Subphylum: Chelicerata
- Class: Arachnida
- Order: Araneae
- Infraorder: Araneomorphae
- Family: Salticidae
- Genus: Microemathis; Logunov, 2020
- Species: M. bulalacao

Binomial name
- Microemathis bulalacao Logunov, 2020

Genus of jumping spiders

Microemathis is a monotypic genus of southeast Asian jumping spiders containing the single species, Microemathis bulalacao. It was first described by Dmitri V. Logunov in 2020, and it has only been found in the Philippines.

== See also ==
- List of Salticidae genera
