= Stenaelurillus ilesai =

Scientific classification
- Kingdom: Animalia
- Phylum: Arthropoda
- Subphylum: Chelicerata
- Class: Arachnida
- Order: Araneae
- Infraorder: Araneomorphae
- Family: Salticidae
- Genus: Stenaelurillus
- Species: S. ilesai

Binomial name
- Stenaelurillus ilesai Kanesharatnam & Benjamin, 2020

Species of jumping spider

Stenaelurillus ilesai is a species of jumping spider in the genus Stenaelurillus that lives in Sri Lanka. It lives on or near the ground and has been found in plant litter. First described in 2020, the spider is medium-sized, between 4.5 and 5.25 mm (0.177 and 0.207 in). The female is larger than the male but is otherwise very similar externally, particularly in their abdomens, which are pale brown and marked with black blotches and spots. The male have a white stripe that runs across the front of its carapace, the upper part of its front section, that the female lacks. This stripe helps distinguish the spider from the related Stenaelurillus lesserti. Underneath, the spiders' sternum is lighter than their topsides. The female's epigyne, the external visible part of its copulatory organs, has a semicircular hole at the back. Its rounded, single chambered receptacles, or spermathecae, help distinguish the spider from other spiders in the genus.

== Taxonomy and etymology ==
Stenaelurillus ilesai is a species of jumping spider, a member of the family Salticidae, that was first described by the arachnologists Nilani Kanesharatnam and Suresh P. Benjamin in 2020. He placed it in the genus Stenaelurillus, first circumscribed by Eugène Simon in 1876. The genus name relates to the name of the genus Aelurillus, which itself derives from the Greek word for cat, with the addition of a Greek stem meaning narrow. The species is inamed after Ilesha Sandunika Ileperuma Arachchi, who found the first example of the spider.

In his 2015 phylogenetic classification, the evolutionary biology Wayne Maddison placed the genus Stenaelurillus in the subtribe Aelurillina in the tribe Aelurillini and listed the tribe in the clade Saltafresia. Two years later, in 2017, it was grouped with nine other genera of jumping spiders by Jerzy Prószyński under the name Aelurillines. The holotype is stored in the Colombo National Museum.

== Description ==
The spider is medium-sized, the male having a total body length of typically 4.5 mm (0.18 in) while the female is generally larger, measuring 5.25 mm (0.207 in) in total body length.The male has a form that consists of an oval front section, or cephalothorax, and, behind that, a slightly thinner abdomen. The black upper part of its cephalothorax, its carapace, measures 2.25 mm (0.089 in) in length and 1.8 mm (0.071 in) in width. Its eye field is slightly raised and has a covering of pale brown and white bristles. Its eyes are surrounded with reddish brown rings and, behind them, is a white stripe that crosses over its surface and then curves around to become two lines of white blotches towards the back of its carapace. There is another indistinct marking on the middle of its carapace. There are also white stripes that run down its sides. The part of its face known as its clypeus is red and has a covering of dense light grey bristles. The underside of its cephalothorax, its sternum, is lighter than its topsides and oval.

The male's abdomen is similar in size to its carapace and measures typically 2.8 mm (0.11 in) long and 2 mm (0.079 in) wide. Shaped like a shield, it has a row of dense pale yellow long bristles along its front edge. The top is pale brown and marked with a pattern of white waves towards the front, black blotches in the middle and three white spots towards the back. Underneath, it is black, as are its spinnerets, which it uses to spin webs. Its front legs are marked with red blotches. Its remaining legs are pale brown and are marked with black stripes between their sections.

The male's copulatory organs are found at the end of its bristly pedipalps. It has a short stout projection on the end of its palpal tibia, or tibial apophysis, and a hooked curved project on its side called a retrolateral apophysis. At the end of the tibia is a curved hairy cymbium and, attached to that, an oval palpal bulb. The bulb is covered in a bag like tegulum with a large bulge and bristly fringe at the bottom. At the top, there is a crest of fine stiff hairs and a short fat curved embolus and, on the other side of a valley another apophysis. The spider is similar to Stenaelurillus lesserti in both its external morphology and its copulatory organs. It can be distinguished by the presence of a white curved stripe cutting across the spider behind its forward eyes rather than there being red markings, the white wavy pattern on the top of its abdomen and the shorter hairs that can be seen on its palpal femur.

The female is similar to the male in shape but overall larger. Its hairy carapace is 2.65 mm (0.104 in) long and 2.05 mm (0.081 in) wide but lacks the white markings on the top. Instead, there is a lighter patch in the middle of the spider's carapace and white belts on its sides. Its clypeus is orange. Its abdomen has a length of 2.7 in (69 mm) and width of 2 mm (0.079 in) but is otherwise similar to the male's on top. It lacks the black area that the male has on its underside. Its front legs are pale brown and have blackish-brown markings. Otherwise, it is very similar to the male.

Its epigyne, the external visible part of its copulatory organs, is flat and shows slight signs of sclerotization. There is a semicircular hole at the back of the epigene near the edge where this is a partially developed basal plate. There are two broad and inconspicuous copulatory openings that lead via short insemination ducts to large, rounded spermathecae, or receptacles. On the spermathecae walls are fertilization ducts. Its rounded, single chambered spermathecae and short and stout fertilization ducts help distinguish the spider from its relatives.

== Distribution and habitat ==
Stenaelurillus spiders are found throughout Africa, Asia and Europe, across both the Afrotropical and Palearctic realms. They are particularly common in West Africa, the south-eastern part of Central Africa and South Asia. Stenaelurillus ilesai is endemic to Sri Lanka. The holotype was found on 6 July 2013 in the National Heritage Sanctuary in Mihintale, Anuradhapura District living at an altitude of 300 m (980 ft) above sea level. The spider has also been found in Allepothana and Udawattakelle. The spider lives on or near the ground and is often found in large numbers. It has been seen in plant litter.
