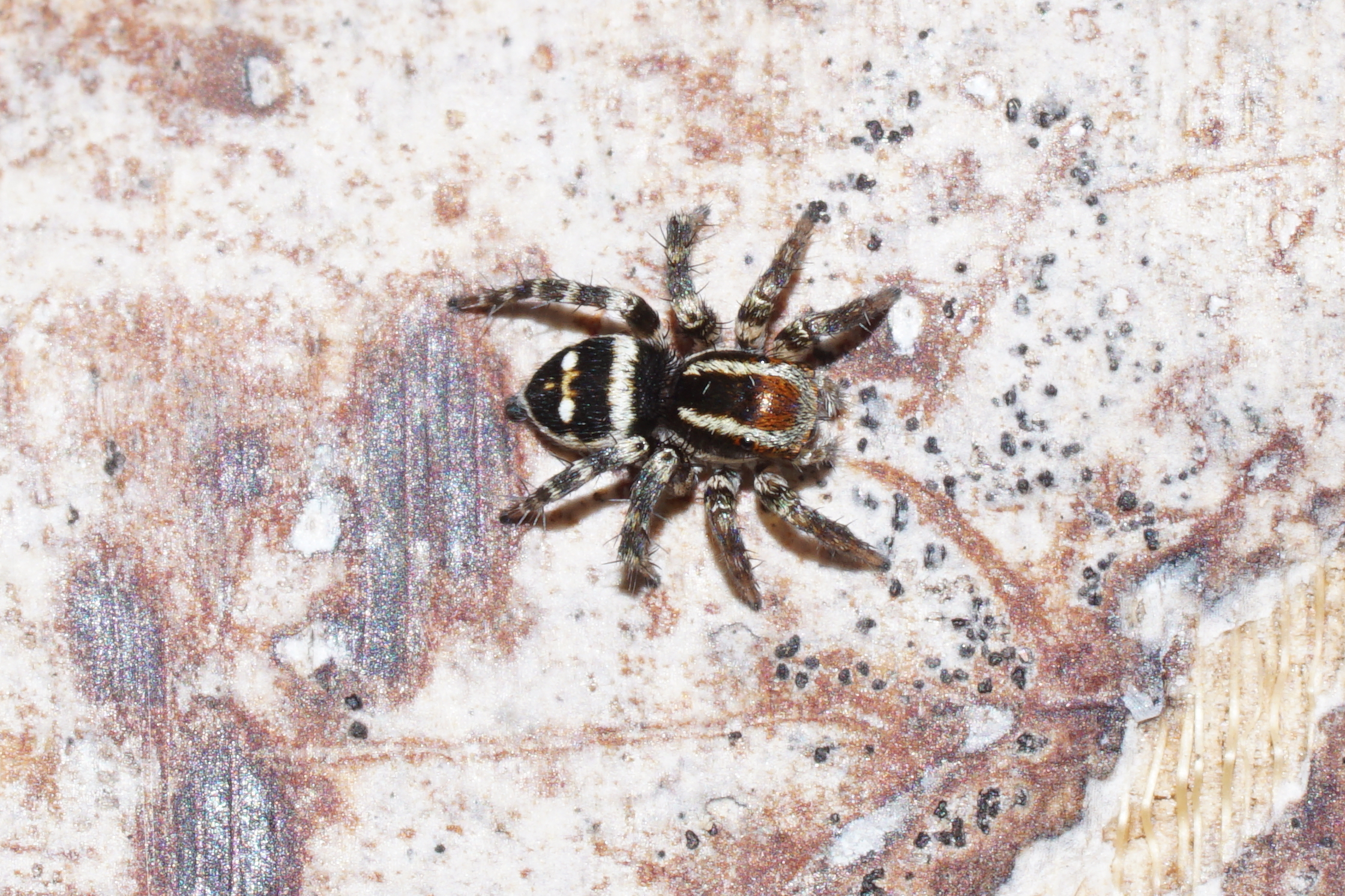
- The related Stenaelurillus albus

Scientific classification
- Kingdom: Animalia
- Phylum: Arthropoda
- Subphylum: Chelicerata
- Class: Arachnida
- Order: Araneae
- Infraorder: Araneomorphae
- Family: Salticidae
- Genus: Stenaelurillus
- Species: S. siyamae

Binomial name
- Stenaelurillus siyamae Logunov & Azarkina, 2018

= Stenaelurillus siyamae =

Species of spider

Stenaelurillus siyamae is a species of jumping spider in the genus Stenaelurillus that lives in Sudan. It was first described in 2018 by Dmitri Logunov and Galina Azarkina from a holotype specimen found by a collector named Siyam in the Dinder National Park. The species takes its name from the collector. Only the female has been identified. The spider is small, with a carapace 2 mm (0.079 in) long and an abdomen 2.3 mm (0.091 in) long. The carapace is hairy, brown and has four white streaks, two made of scales on the body and two made of hairs on the edges, while the abdomen is a mixture of grey, brown and yellow with two large brown stripes flanking a thinner white stripe, all made of hairs. It is similar to Stenaelurillus sudanicus also found in the country but can be distinguished by the design of the epigyne, which is oval, its widely separated facing copulatory openings, and long, S-shaped insemination ducts.

== Taxonomy ==
Stenaelurillus siyamae was first described by Dmitri Logunov and Galina Azarkina in 2018. It was placed in the genus Stenaelurillus, first raised by Eugène Simon in 1886. The genus name relates to the genus name Aelurillus, which itself derives from the Greek word for cat, with the addition of a Greek stem meaning narrow. It was placed in the subtribe Aelurillina in the tribe Aelurillini in the clade Saltafresia by Wayne Maddison in 2015. Two years later, in 2017, it was grouped with nine other genera of jumping spiders under the name Aelurillines. The species name is taken from the collector of the first example of the spider to be identified, M. Siyam from South Sudan.

== Description ==
Only the female has been described. The spider is small and has an overall shape that is typical for the genus. The hairy brown carapace is typically 2 mm (0.079 in) long and 1.6 mm (0.063 in) wide. It has a pattern of two stripes that go from the front to the back made of white scales and additional stripes on the edges made of white hairs. The abdomen is a combination of grey, yellow and brown with a stripe made of white hairs flanked by larger stripes made of brown hairs, with another white hairy stripe lining the sides. It is 2.3 mm (0.091 in) long and 1.8 mm (0.071 in) wide. The chelicerae, clypeus and legs are brown-yellow but the chelicerae are covered in white hairs while the clypeus and legs have dark brown hairs. There is a dark brown stripe on the clypeus from the carapace sides to the end. The spinnerets are similarly brown-yellow while the pedipalps are yellow with white hairs and brown bristles. The epigyne is flat and round with large oval copulatory openings and a deep wide pocket. The spermathecae are bean-shaped.

The spider is very similar to Stenaelurillus sudanicus, especially in the colour and patterns on the spider's body. However, it can be distinguished by the design of the sexual organs. Stenaelurillus siyamae has widely separated and facing copulatory openings, and longer, S-shaped insemination ducts than the other species. Logunov and Azarkina thought that the male of the species could be one of those currently identified as Stenaelurillus strandi.

== Distribution ==
The species is endemic to Sudan. The holotype was identified in the Dinder National Park based on a specimen collected in 2013. It is known only from that local area. The similar Stenaelurillus sudanicus is found in the same country.
