= Stenaelurillus pecten =

Scientific classification
- Kingdom: Animalia
- Phylum: Arthropoda
- Subphylum: Chelicerata
- Class: Arachnida
- Order: Araneae
- Infraorder: Araneomorphae
- Family: Salticidae
- Genus: Stenaelurillus
- Species: S. pecten

Binomial name
- Stenaelurillus pecten Wesołowska, 2014

Species of jumping spider

Stenaelurillus pecten is a species of jumping spider that lives in Botswana and Zambia. A member of the genus Stenaelurillus, it was first described in 2014 by the arachnologist Wanda Wesołowska. The spider is small, with a brown front section, or cephalothorax, that is between 2.3 and 3.1 mm (0.091 and 0.122 in) in length and, behind that, a black abdomen between 2.2 and 3.6 mm (0.087 and 0.142 in) long. The female is lighter than the male. The spider's carapace, the hard upper side of its cephalothorax, has a line of brushes around it, formed of white hair. It is distinguished from other members of the genus by the comb-like appendage on the male's palpal tibia, after which the spider gets its name. The female has a distinctive arrangement of the copulatory openings in its epigyne, the external visible part of its copulatory organs.

== Taxonomy and etymology ==
Stenaelurillus pecten is a species of jumping spider, a member of the family Salticidae, that was first described by the arachnologist Wanda Wesołowska in 2014. It is one of over 500 species identified by the Polish scientist. She placed it in the genus Stenaelurillus, which had been first circumscribed by the natural scientist Eugène Simon in 1886. The genus was placed in the subtribe Aelurillina in the tribe Aelurillini by Wayne Maddison in 2015, which is itself part of the clade Saltafresia. Two year later, in 2017, It was grouped with nine other genera of jumping spiders under the name Aelurillines.

The genus name relates to the genus Aelurillus, which itself derives from the Greek word for 'cat', with the addition of a Greek stem meaning 'narrow'. The spider's specific name is the Latin word for 'comb' and recalls the shape of the appendages on the male palpal tibia.

== Description ==
The spider is small. The male has a cephalothorax, the forward part of its body that measures between 2.3 and 2.8 mm (0.091 and 0.110 in) in length and between 1.6 and 2.2 mm (0.063 and 0.087 in) in width. The hard upper side of its cephalothorax, its carapace, is a dark brown oval that is covered in dense brown hairs. Two stripes of white hairs line the edge which looks like brushes and another two cross the thorax. The eye field is black. The underside of its cephalothorax, or sternum, is yellow to light brownish and covered in light hairs. Its chelicerae, which act as its jaws, are brownish, the remainder of its mouthparts, its labium and maxillae, are yellow.

The spider's abdomen, the rear part of its body found behind its cephalothorax, is oval and jet black with long dark bristles. Its measures between 2.2 and 2.8 mm (0.087 and 0.110 in) long and 1.7 and 2.2 mm (0.067 and 0.087 in) wide. Some specimens have a light area in the middle; some have a single small patch at the back and others three small patches. All have long dark bristles along the edge of their abdomen. Its sides and underside are yellowish. The spider has long brown spinnerets and yellow to brownish legs that have black sections.

The spider's pedipalps are yellow with a dark line at the end of its patella. There two curved protrusions on its palpal tibia, or tibial apophyses, that show strong evidence of sclerotization. One of them is comb-shaped and has several teeth. The other is thin and has a pointed tip. These apophyses, particularly the former, help distinguish the spider from others in the genus. At the end of the pedipalp, there is a cymbium that is covered in dense black hairs. Attached to the cymbium is a bulbous palpal bulb that has a bulge at the bottom that overlaps the palpal tibia and two smaller appendages at the top. Projecting from the top from one of the appendages is a thin and delicate embolus.

The female is very similar to the male but is lighter. It is similar in size with a cephalothorax between 2.5 and 3.1 mm (0.098 and 0.122 in) long and 1.9 and 2.3 mm (0.075 and 0.091 in) wide and an abdomen between 3.1 and 3.6 in (79 and 91 mm) long and 2.3 and 2.7 mm (0.091 and 0.106 in) wide. Its abdomen has a wide band across it and two white spots towards the back of the spider. As in the similar Stenaelurillus abramovi and Stenaelurillus lesserti, the copulatory openings in the epigyne, the external visible part of its copulatory organs, are close together. However, it is distinguishable from other species by the way that the copulatory openings are closely aligned with each other rather than being separate.

== Distribution ==
Stenaelurillus spiders are found across Africa and Asia. Stenaelurillus pecten has been seen in both Botswana and Zambia. The holotype was identified near Lusaka based on a specimen collected in 1979. The species has also been found near Mumbwa and in the Moremi Game Reserve.
