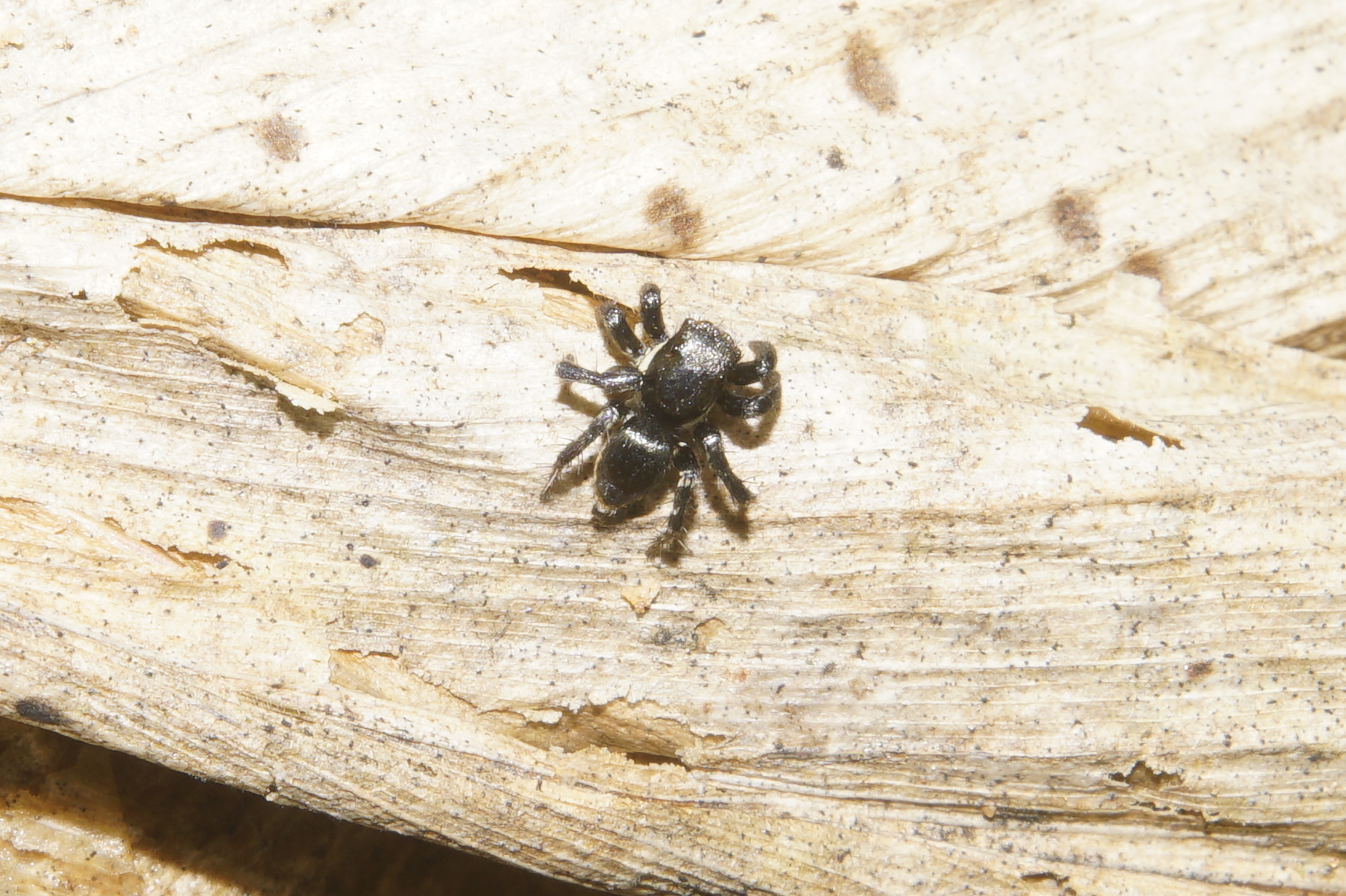
- A spider of the Stenaelurillus genus

Scientific classification
- Kingdom: Animalia
- Phylum: Arthropoda
- Subphylum: Chelicerata
- Class: Arachnida
- Order: Araneae
- Infraorder: Araneomorphae
- Family: Salticidae
- Genus: Stenaelurillus
- Species: S. senegalensis

Binomial name
- Stenaelurillus senegalensis Logunov & Azarkina, 2018

= Stenaelurillus senegalensis =

Species of spider

Stenaelurillus senegalensis is a species of jumping spider in the genus Stenaelurillus that lives in Senegal. Named after the country where it was first found, it was first described in 2018 by Dmitri Logunov and Galina Azarkina. The spider is small, with a carapace between 1.7 and 2.5 mm (0.067 and 0.098 in) long and abdomen between 1.6 and 3.45 mm (0.063 and 0.136 in) long, although the female is larger than the male. The carapace is hairy, brown and has two white stripes. The abdomen differs between the male and female. The male has a pattern of yellow spots and a brown stripe. The female has a cross of yellow stripe and two brown stripes. The male has a bulging palpal bulb while the female has a flat epigyne with widely separated and backward-facing copulatory openings. It is similar to Stenaelurillus nigricaudus, also found in the country, but can be distinguished by the design of its long straight embolus and the lack of pockets in the epigyne.

== Taxonomy and etymology ==
Stenaelurillus senegalensis, is a species of jumping spider, a member of the family Salticidae, that was first described by the arachnologists Dmitri Logunov and Galina Azarkina in 2018. It was placed in the genus Stenaelurillus, first raised by Eugène Simon in 1886. It was placed in the subtribe Aelurillina in the tribe Aelurillini by Wayne Maddison in 2015, who listed the tribe in the clade Saltafresia. Two years later, in 2017, it was grouped with nine other genera of jumping spiders under the name Aelurillines. The genus name relates to the genus name Aelurillus, which itself derives from the Greek word for cat, with the addition of a Greek stem meaning narrow. The species is named after Senegal, the country in which it was first found.

== Description ==
Stenaelurillus senegalensis is a medium-sized spider with a body that is divided into two main parts, a cephalothorax and an abdomen. The male has a brown carapace, the hard upper part of the cephalothorax, that measures between 1.7 and 2.1 mm (0.067 and 0.083 in) in length and between 1.4 and 1.6 mm (0.055 and 0.063 in) in width. It is covered in brown scales and has wide stripes made of white scales, along with edging also of white scales. Its eye field is brown and is decorated with both yellow-white scales and long brown bristles. The underside of the cephalothorax, or sternum, is yellow. The spider has yellow chelicerae that are covered with white hairs. The remainder of its mouthparts, including its labium and maxillae, are also yellow. Long white hairs also cover its yellow or brown-yellow clypeus.

The male's abdomen is dark brown on top and yellow underneath, measuring between 1.6 and 2.0 mm (0.063 and 0.079 in) long and 1.3 and 1.45 mm (0.051 and 0.057 in) wide. It has a dark brown scutum that covers two-thirds of the surface and a pattern consisting of four yellow spots and a wide hairy brown stripe. The spider has yellow book lung covers and, while its front spinnerets are yellow, its back ones are brown; its legs are also brown. There are white hairs on its yellow pedipalps. Its copulatory organs are distinctive. Its simple cymbium has a scattering of brown bristles while there are long brown hairs on the palpal tibia.Its tegulum is small and elongated with an appendage that is shaped like a finger. There are other distinctive appendages attached to the palpal bulb. The top of the tegulum is shaped like a heart, with a long thin embolus projecting out over the top of the bulb.

The female is similar to the male in shape but slightly larger. It has a carapace that is typically 2.5 mm (0.098 in) long and 2.0 mm (0.079 in) wide and an abdomen that has a length of 3.45 in (88 mm) and width of 2.65 mm (0.104 in). It has a brown carapace, like the male, that is covered in dark brown hairs and has two stripes on the top consisting of white scales. Its sternum is yellow like the male, and its yellow chelicerae are similarly covered in white hairs. In contrast, its mouthparts are brown-yellow and its clypeus is brownish-yellow. Its abdomen is more grey in colour and has a pattern consisting of two parallel brown stripes crossed by a yellow stripe, all made of hairs, and a fringe of white hairs. Its book lung covers and spinnerets are all yellow. Although its pedipalps are predominantly yellow, it has some segments that are brown, and there are brown patches and rings on its otherwise yellow legs.

The female's copulatory organs are distinctive, although its spermathecae, or receptacles, are very similar to the related Stenaelurillus nigricaudus. Its epigyne, the external visible part of its copulatory organs, is flat and lacks the pocket that is the feature of many of the genus. Its epigynal plate is particularly long and extends beyond the back of the epigyne, beyond the epigastric furrow. Its copulatory openings are widely separated and face backwards. These lead to short and wide insemination ducts and large round spermathecae. In other ways as well, the spider is very similar to Stenaelurillus nigricaudus, especially in the colour and patterns on the spider's body. However, it can be distinguished by the design of the sexual organs. Stenaelurillus senegalensis has a long straight embolus and lacks the pocket in the epigyne of the other species.

== Distribution ==
Stenaelurillus species are found throughout Africa apart from particular areas near the equator. They are particularly common in western and central Africa. Stenaelurillus senegalensis is endemic to Senegal. The holotype was identified based on a specimen collected near Richard Toll in 1991. It is known only from that local area. There is some overlap with the range of the more widely distributed Stenaelurillus nigricaudus, which is also found in the same country but has also been found in other areas of Africa. It has been found in areas of savanna.
