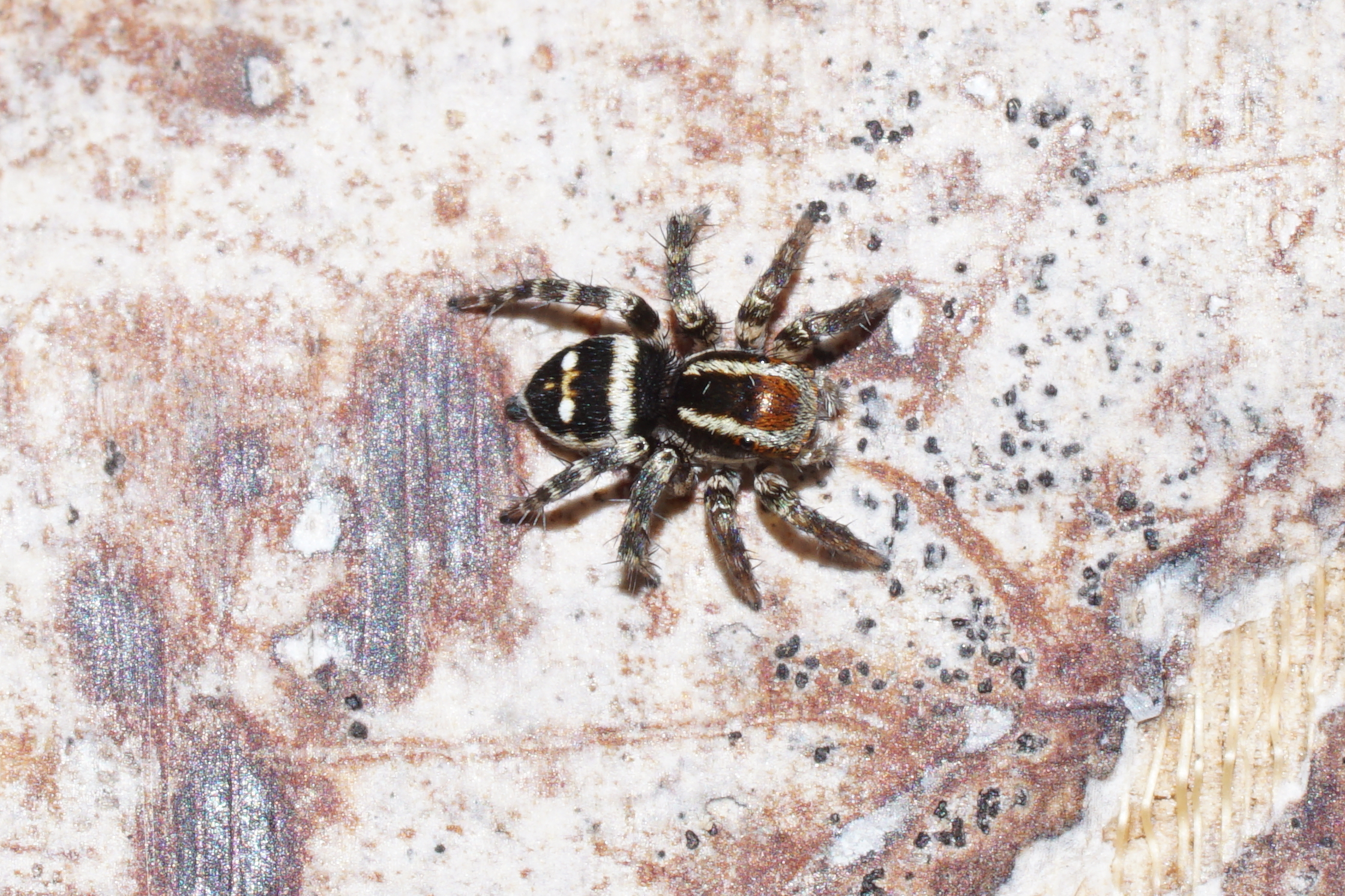
- The related Stenaelurillus albus

Scientific classification
- Kingdom: Animalia
- Phylum: Arthropoda
- Subphylum: Chelicerata
- Class: Arachnida
- Order: Araneae
- Infraorder: Araneomorphae
- Family: Salticidae
- Genus: Stenaelurillus
- Species: S. sudanicus

Binomial name
- Stenaelurillus sudanicus Wesołowska, 2014

= Stenaelurillus sudanicus =

Species of spider

Stenaelurillus sudanicus is a species of jumping spider in the genus Stenaelurillus that lives in Sudan. It was first described in 2014 by Wanda Wesołowska. Only the female has been identified. The spider is small, with a brown cephalothorax 2.2 mm (0.087 in) long and an abdomen 2.5 mm (0.098 in) in length. The abdomen has markings similar to a spider of the genus Phlegra. It is distinguished from other members of the genus Stenaelurillus by the way that the copulatory openings face backwards.

== Taxonomy and etymology ==
Stenaelurillus sudanicus was first described by Wanda Wesołowska in 2014. It is one of over 500 species identified by the Polish arachnologist. The genus Stenaelurillus was first raised by Eugène Simon in 1886. The name relates to the genus name Aelurillus, which itself derives from the Greek word for cat, with the addition of a Greek stem meaning narrow. In 2015, Wayne Maddison placed it in the subtribe Aelurillina, which he positioned in the tribe Aelurillini within the clade Saltafresia. In 2017, it was grouped with nine other genera of jumping spiders under the name Aelurillines. The species name derives from the country where it was first found, Sudan.

== Description ==
Only the female has been described. The spider is small, with a cephalothorax that measures 2.2 mm (0.087 in) in length and 1.7 mm (0.067 in) in width and an abdomen that is 2.5 mm (0.098 in) long and 1.9 mm (0.075 in) wide. It has a brown carapace with a pair of white streaks, one along the edge of the body and the other stretching from the front to back. The eye field is black, while the legs are brown. The abdomen has markings that are more typical for spiders from the Phlegra genus, with three white stripes on a black background. The spider has yellowish grey pedipalps and a round palpal bulb. The epigyne has a deep pocket with copulatory openings placed to the side. It differs from the similar Stenaelurillus siyamae, also found in the same area, by the way that the copulatory openings face backwards.

== Distribution and habitat ==
The distribution is restricted to Sudan. The holotype for the species was found near Kerma in 1989. It was discovered in a house, which implies a level of comfort the spider has living in areas of human habitation.
