= Stenaelurillus specularis =

Scientific classification
- Kingdom: Animalia
- Phylum: Arthropoda
- Subphylum: Chelicerata
- Class: Arachnida
- Order: Araneae
- Infraorder: Araneomorphae
- Family: Salticidae
- Genus: Stenaelurillus
- Species: S. specularis

Binomial name
- Stenaelurillus specularis Wesołowska, 2014

Species of jumping spider

Stenaelurillus specularis is a species of jumping spider that the endemic to Malawi. It was first described in 2014 by the arachnologist Wanda Wesołowska. A member of the genus Stenaelurillus, the spider is small, with a brown forward section, or cephalothorax, that is between 2.1 and 2.8 mm (0.083 and 0.110 in) in length and, behind that, a black abdomen that is between 2.6 and 3.2 mm (0.10 and 0.13 in) long. The upper side of its cephalothorax, or carapace, has two white streaks and the female abdomen has a triangular-shaped white marking. It can be distinguished from other members of the genus by the male's shiny black area on the abdomen, after which the species is named. and the female's short, wide epigyne, the external visible part of its copulatory organs, that has two large oval copulatory openings.

== Taxonomy and etymology ==
Stenaelurillus specularis is a species of jumping spider, a member of the family Salticidae, that was first described by the arachnologist Wanda Wesołowska in 2014. It is one of over 500 species identified by the Polish arachnologist. It was placed in the genus Stenaelurillus that was first circumscribed by Eugène Simon in 1886. The genus was placed in the subtribe Aelurillina in the tribe Aelurillini by Wayne Maddison in 2015, who listed the tribe in the clade Saltafresia. Two years later, in 2017, Jerzy Prószyński grouped it with nine other genera of jumping spiders under the name Aelurillines.

The spider's generic name relates to the name of the genus Aelurillus, which itself derives from the Greek word for 'cat', with the addition of a Greek stem meaning 'narrow'. Its specific name is a Latin word that can be translated 'brilliant' and recalls the shining area on the male's abdomen.

== Description ==
jumping The spider is small. Its body is divided into two main parts: a more rectangular cephalothorax and a more oval abdomen that has a flat front edge. The male has a cephalothorax that measures between 2.4 and 2.8 mm (0.094 and 0.110 in) in length and between 1.9 and 2.0 mm (0.075 and 0.079 in) in width. Its brown carapace, the hard upper part of the cephalothorax, is hairy and slightly pear-shaped. It has two white streaks that cross the main part of the body and wide white bands around the margins. Its has a short eye field that is black and has a covering of long brown bristles. There are white hairs around its eyes. The spider's face, or clypeus, is short and yellowish. The sternum, the underside of the spider's carapace, is yellow as are its chelicerae and the remainder of the spider's mouthparts, its labium and maxilae.

The male's abdomen is oval, black and hairy, between 2.6 and 3.2 mm (0.10 and 0.13 in) long and 1.8 and 1.9 mm (0.071 and 0.075 in) wide, and has a shiny spot that is marked by two patches of non-shiny black. This shiny patch is the most distinguishing feature of the spider. Its underside is yellow. The spider's spinnerets are black, and its legs are generally yellowish-orange with brown leg hairs. Its pedipalps are light and covered in brown and colourless hairs.

The male's copulatory organs are found at the end of its pedipalp. It palpal tibia has a feathery bristles at its tip and a bulge, or tibial apophyses, on its side and another that ends in a curve. Attached to the tibia is a rounded cymbium and, next to this, an irregularly-shaped palpal bulb. It has a hooked bulge at the bottom and a hooked embolus at the top. It is similar to Stenaelurillus darwini but differs in the shape of palpal bulb, having a shorter lobe shape at the rear. The spider can be distinguished from the similar Stenaelurillus tettu by the narrow and bent projection from the palpal bulb.

The female is similar to the male in size and shape. It has an cephalothorax 2.1 mm (0.083 in) long and 2.1 mm (0.083 in) wide and an abdomen 3.0 in (76 mm) long and 2.2 mm (0.087 in) wide. The carapace is also pear-shaped and coloured similarly, but the abdomen has a large triangular area of white similar to other species in the genus. Its spinnerets are light and its legs yellowish-orange with brown leg hairs. Its epigyne, the visible external part of its copulatory organs, is short, wide and has two large oval copulatory openings. The openings are initially wide and lead via insemination ducts to rounded spermathecae, or receptacles. Much of its internal structure shows significant signs of sclerotization. Due to the lack of the abdomen's shiny patch, it is the design of the epigyne that most distinguishes the female of the species from other members of the genus.

== Distribution and habitat ==
The majority of Stenaelurillus spiders are found in Africa. Stenaelurillus specularis endemic to Malawi. It was first identified based on examples found in 1978 living in an old pine plantation amongst the Viphya Mountains.
