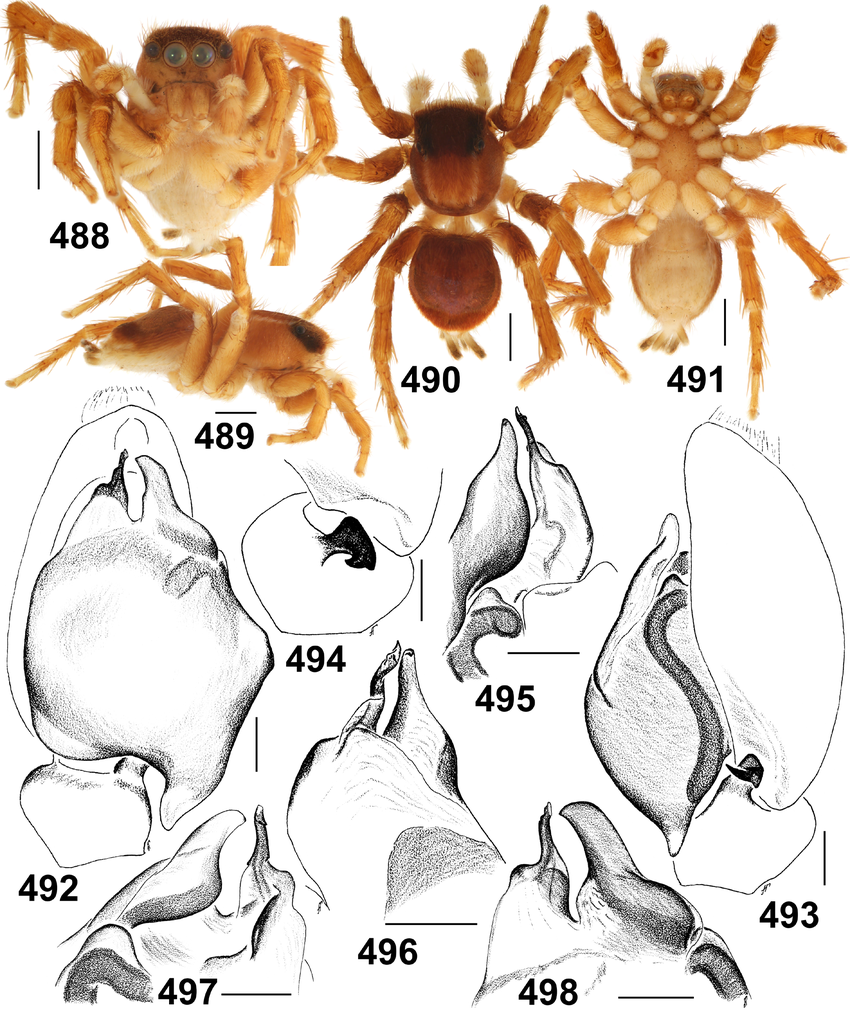
- Male from Malawi. 488 to 491 General appearance. 492 to 498 Detail of its copulatory organs.

Scientific classification
- Kingdom: Animalia
- Phylum: Arthropoda
- Subphylum: Chelicerata
- Class: Arachnida
- Order: Araneae
- Infraorder: Araneomorphae
- Family: Salticidae
- Genus: Stenaelurillus
- Species: S. zambiensis

Binomial name
- Stenaelurillus zambiensis Wesołowska, 2014

= Stenaelurillus zambiensis =

Species of jumping spider

Stenaelurillus zambiensis is a species of jumping spider that lives in Malawi, Zambia and Zimbabwe. A member of the genus Stenaelurillus, it was first described in 2014 by Wanda Wesołowska. The spider is small, the male being smaller than the female, with a forward section, or cephalothorax, that is between 2.6 and 3.2 mm (0.10 and 0.13 in) in length and, behind that, an abdomen measuring between 2.6 and 3.0 mm (0.10 and 0.12 in) in length. The male has a distinctive metallic sheen on its abdomen and eye field. The upper side of the male's cephalothorax is marked with two white streaks while the female has white stripes on the top and side of its cephalothorax. It is distinguished from other members of the genus by the two depressions in the female epigyne, external visible part of its copulatory organs, and the male's straight embolus and the hooked end to the projection, or apophysis, on its palpal tibia.

== Taxonomy and etymology ==
Stenaelurillus zambiensis is a species of jumping spider, a member of the family Salticidae, that was first described by the arachnologist Wanda Wesołowska in 2014. It is one of over 500 species identified by the Polish scientist. The genus Stenaelurillus was first raised by Eugène Simon in 1886. In 2015, Wayne Maddison placed it in the subtribe Aelurillina, which he positioned in the tribe Aelurillini within the clade Saltafresia. In 2017, it was grouped with nine other genera of jumping spiders by Jerzy Prószyński that he named Aelurillines.

The spider's generic name relates to the genus name Aelurillus, which itself derives from the Greek word for cat, with the addition of a Greek stem meaning narrow. Its specific name recalls the country where it was first found, Zambia.

== Description ==
The spider is typical of its genus. The male is small, with a cephalothorax, the forward part of its body, that measures between 2.6 and 2.7 mm (0.10 and 0.11 in) in length and between 1.9 and 2.0 mm (0.075 and 0.079 in) in width. The hard upper side of its cephalothorax, its carapace is brown and pear-shaped. It is covered in dense brown hairs and is marked with a pair of white streaks. Its eye field is black with a metallic feel and has long brown bristles, interspersed with a scattering of short thick hairs, towards the front. The underside of its cephalothorax, or sternum, is yellow to light brownish. The part of the spider's face known as its clypeus is very dark brown and, while its chelicerae, which act as its jaws, are brown, the remainder of its mouthparts, its labium and maxillae, are yellow.

The spider's abdomen is black-brown oval that is between 2.6 and 2.8 mm (0.10 and 0.11 in) long and between 1.9 and 2.1 mm (0.075 and 0.083 in) wide. Two-thirds of its upper surface is covered in a shield, or scutum that has, like the spider's eye field, a distinctive metallic feel. There is a dense covering of long blackish bristles along its front edge. The underside of its abdomen is yellowish. Some specimen have some faint grey-brown dots on their underside. The spider's spinnerets, used to spin webs, are long and, apart from their black tips, also yellowish. It has brown legs and yellowish-grey pedipalps.

The shape of the abdomen differs from other species of Stenaelurillus, which are typically oblong, but the male's most distinctive feature is the shape of its copulatory organs, particularly its straight embolus and the hook at the end of the curved protrusion on its palpal tibia, or tibial apophysis. It has a hairy cymbium at the end of its pedipalp. Next to it, and dominating it, is a large bulbous palpal bulb, which has a large pointed projections both at the top and the bottom, larger than its embolus, and large bulge on its side.

The female is larger than the male, with a cephalothorax between 3.0 and 3.2 mm (0.12 and 0.13 in) long and 2.2 and 2.4 mm (0.087 and 0.094 in) wide and an abdomen between 3.1 and 4.0 mm (0.12 and 0.16 in) long and 2.7 and 3.0 mm (0.11 and 0.12 in) wide. Its carapace is brown, marked with a pair of white stripes on its top and more on its sides. The hairs on its surface are brown and white. Its eye field is black and has both long bristles and short hairs. Its mouthparts are similar to the male. Its oval abdomen has a shallow notch on its front end. It is mainly brown on top, lighter to the front, with a whitish belt running around its middle and two small round spots towards the back. Underneath, its abdomen is yellowish, as are its sides. Both the abdomen and eye field lack a metallic look of the male. It has long light spinnerets that are covered in brown hairs. Its legs are light brown and have patches of dark hairs.

The female's copulatory organs also help identify the spider. The external visible part of its copulatory organs, its epigyne, has two large rounded depressions, which distinguishes it from other spiders, alongside its narrow, straight and tube-like insemination ducts. Its spermathecae, or receptacles, are shaped like figs.

== Distribution and habitat ==
Stenaelurillus spiders are found across Africa and Asia. Stenaelurillus zambiensis has a distribution that includes Malawi, Zambia and Zimbabwe. The holotype for the species was found near Mfuwe, Zambia, in 1995. The spider has also identified from specimen taken from the Mana Pools National Park, Zimbabwe, and the Nature Reserve at Lilongwe, Malawi. It lives in woodland of Combretum trees.
