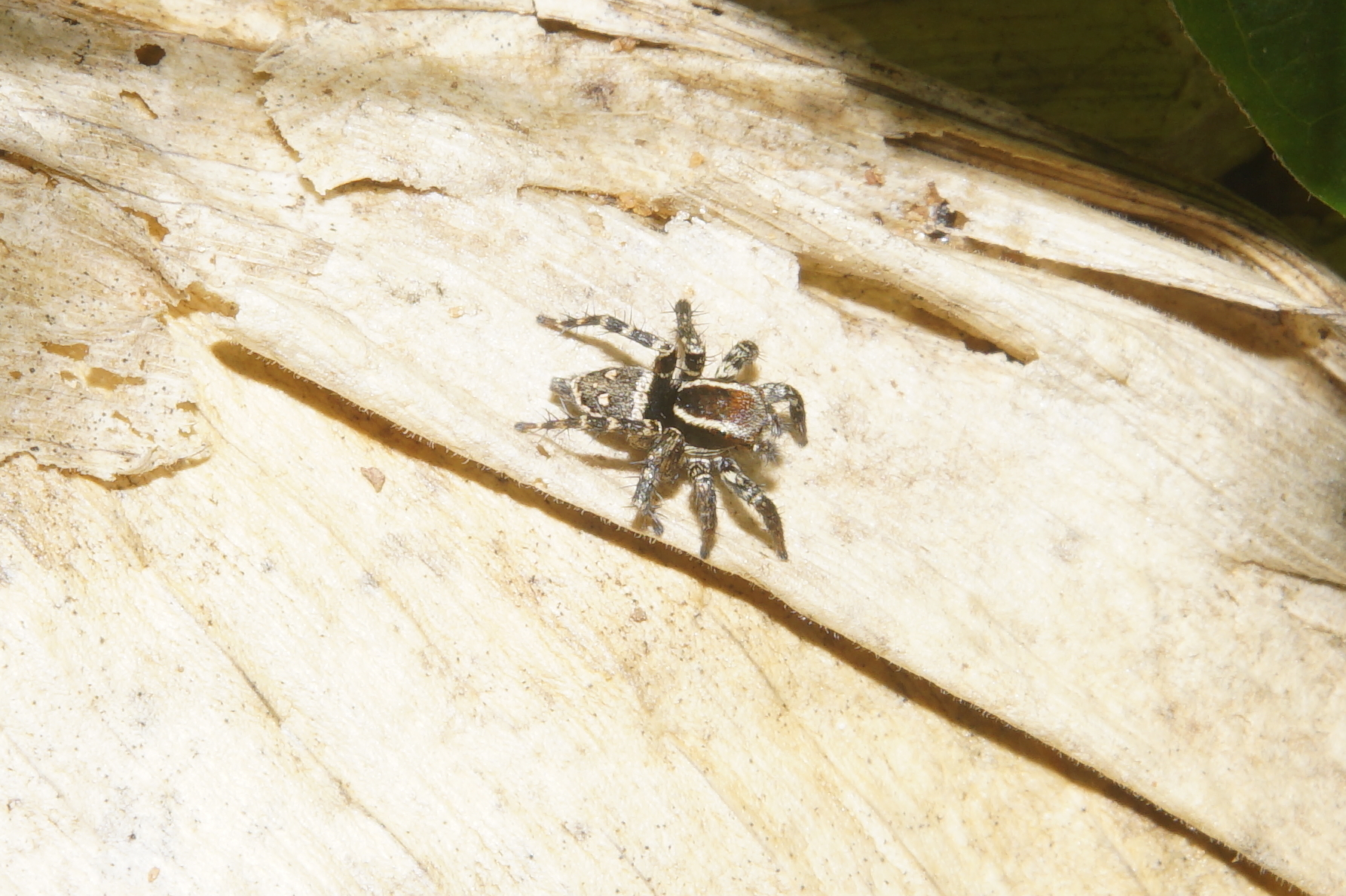
- A spider of the genus Stenaelurillus

Scientific classification
- Kingdom: Animalia
- Phylum: Arthropoda
- Subphylum: Chelicerata
- Class: Arachnida
- Order: Araneae
- Infraorder: Araneomorphae
- Family: Salticidae
- Genus: Stenaelurillus
- Species: S. nigricaudus

Binomial name
- Stenaelurillus nigricaudus Simon, 1886

Synonyms
- Stenaelurillus nigritarsis Simon, 1886; Aelurillus sahariensis Beland and Millot, 1941

= Stenaelurillus nigricaudus =

Species of spider

Stenaelurillus nigricaudus, synonyms Aelurillus sahariensis and Stenaelurillus nigritarsis, is the type species of the genus Stenaelurillus. It is a jumping spider that lives in Algeria, Burkina Faso, Gambia, Mali, Niger and Senegal. The male was first described by Eugène Simon in 1886 and the female initially in 1936 by Ludovico di Caporiacco and more thoroughly by Nikolaj Scharff and Tamás Szűts in 2005. It is a medium-sized spider with a cephalothorax between 2.4 and 2.7 mm (0.094 and 0.106 in) and an abdomen that is between 2 and 3.7 in (51 and 94 mm) long. The carapace is reddish-brown and has two white or yellow stripes. The female abdomen has a pattern of stripes and spots, with some examples having brown spots inside yellow spots. The male abdomen has either a single dark stripe or two white and one brown stripes. While the female pedipalps are yellow, the male has either dark or brown pedipalps. The female has distinctive flanges at its copulatory openings. The male is distinguished by the shape of its palpal bulb and, particularly, of its hook-shaped embolus.

== Taxonomy ==
Stenaelurillus nigricauda was first described by Eugène Simon in 1886. Simon described the genus Stenaelurillus, and immediately followed this with a description of the species. In consequence, although not named as the type species, it was generally considered so. It was explicitly named as such by Simon in 1903, and subsequently renamed Stenaelurillus nigricaudus. The genus name relates to the genus name Aelurillus, which itself derives from the Greek word for cat, with the addition of a Greek stem meaning narrow. The species name is a combination of Latin words for black and tail. In 2015, the genus was placed in the subtribe Aelurillina in the tribe Aelurillini in the clade Saltafresia by Wayne Maddison. Two years later, it was grouped with nine other genera of jumping spiders under the name Aelurillines.

In the same work as he described Stenaelurillus nigricauda, Simon also described another species in the same genus, Stenaelurillus nigritarsis. Doug Clark noted that the females seemed to be of one species in 1974. On reexamination in 2005, it was found that the males were also of the same species. In 2018, Aelurillus sahariensis, first described by Lucien Berland and Jacques Millot in 1941, was also identified as a synonym of the species by Dmitri Logunov and Galina Azarkina. The species was also known as Stenaelurillus sahariensis.

== Description ==
The spider is medium-sized and of a shape that is typical of the genus. The male is similar to Stenaelurillus senegalensis in colouration. It has a carapace that measures between 2 and 2.3 mm (0.079 and 0.091 in) in length and between 1.35 and 1.6 mm (0.053 and 0.063 in) in width. that is a pear-shaped and moderately high, with a short black eye field. The thorax is reddish-brown and has two white or yellow stripes. The edging is also white. The eye field has dense grey hairs. The clypeus is light brown or yellow and the chelicerae is dark brown-yellow with two very small teeth at the front. The spinnerets are long and yellow, and the legs are short and range from dark yellow and light brown. The ovoid abdomen has similar colouring and has a single darker stripe down the middle. It has surface hairs and bristles on the edge. Some examples have three stripes, a black one flanked by two white. The abdomen is between 2 and 2.4 mm (0.079 and 0.094 in) long and 1.35 and 1.75 mm (0.053 and 0.069 in) wide. The pedipalps are dark brown or black. The embolus is hook-shaped, and has a large base attached to the palpal bulb. The shape of the palpal bulb is unusual but it is shape of the embolus that most distinguishes the species.

The female of the species Stenaelurillus nigritarsis was first identified in 1936 by Ludovico di Caporiacco and of Stenaelurillus nigricauda by Berland and Millot in 1941, but their descriptions were very limited. It was described in more detail in 2005 by Nikolaj Scharff and Tamás Szűts. However, even they doubted that the examples they had were from the species so was not until Wanda Wesołowska's article of 2014 that a full description was made. The spider is very similar to the male and shape, but is larger and lighter in colouration. The cephalothorax is between 2.4 and 2.7 mm (0.094 and 0.106 in) long and 1.8 and 2.0 mm (0.071 and 0.079 in) wide and the abdomen between 2.3 and 3.7 in (58 and 94 mm) long and 2.0 and 27 mm (0.079 and 1.063 in) wide. The carapace is also pear-shaped and dark brown. The abdomen is more swollen and yellow. It has a more detailed pattern of wide stripes, covered in scales, and yellow spots. On some examples, the spots have smaller brown spots inside them. The spinnerets are yellow to brown and legs yellow with brown markings. The pedipalps are yellow. The epigyne is small with a flat plate, a concave rear and a deep narrow pocket. The copulatory openings are widely separated, the insemination ducts are short, wide and slightly bent toward each other and the spermathecae are large and round. There are flanges on the copulatory openings which are distinctive for the species. The presence of the pocket distinguishes the species from the otherwise similar Stenaelurillus senegalensis.

== Distribution ==
The spider thrives in both the northwest part of the Afrotropical realm and southwest part of the Palaearctic realm. The holotype was found near Dakar in Senegal and listed in 1886. The first example of the species from Algeria, originally named Stenaelurillus nigritarsis, was identified in Bou Saâda at the same time. Subsequently, the spider was identified from specimen found in other areas of Senegal, including Richard Toll. The species was subsequently discovered, based on a male specimen found in 2001, to live in the Kiang West National Park in the Gambia. It lives in Niger, near the border to Burkina Faso, and has been discovered near Niamey. It has also been found to be living in Mali, based on an example found in 1941, and Burkina Faso itself, from six females and six males found in 1993.
