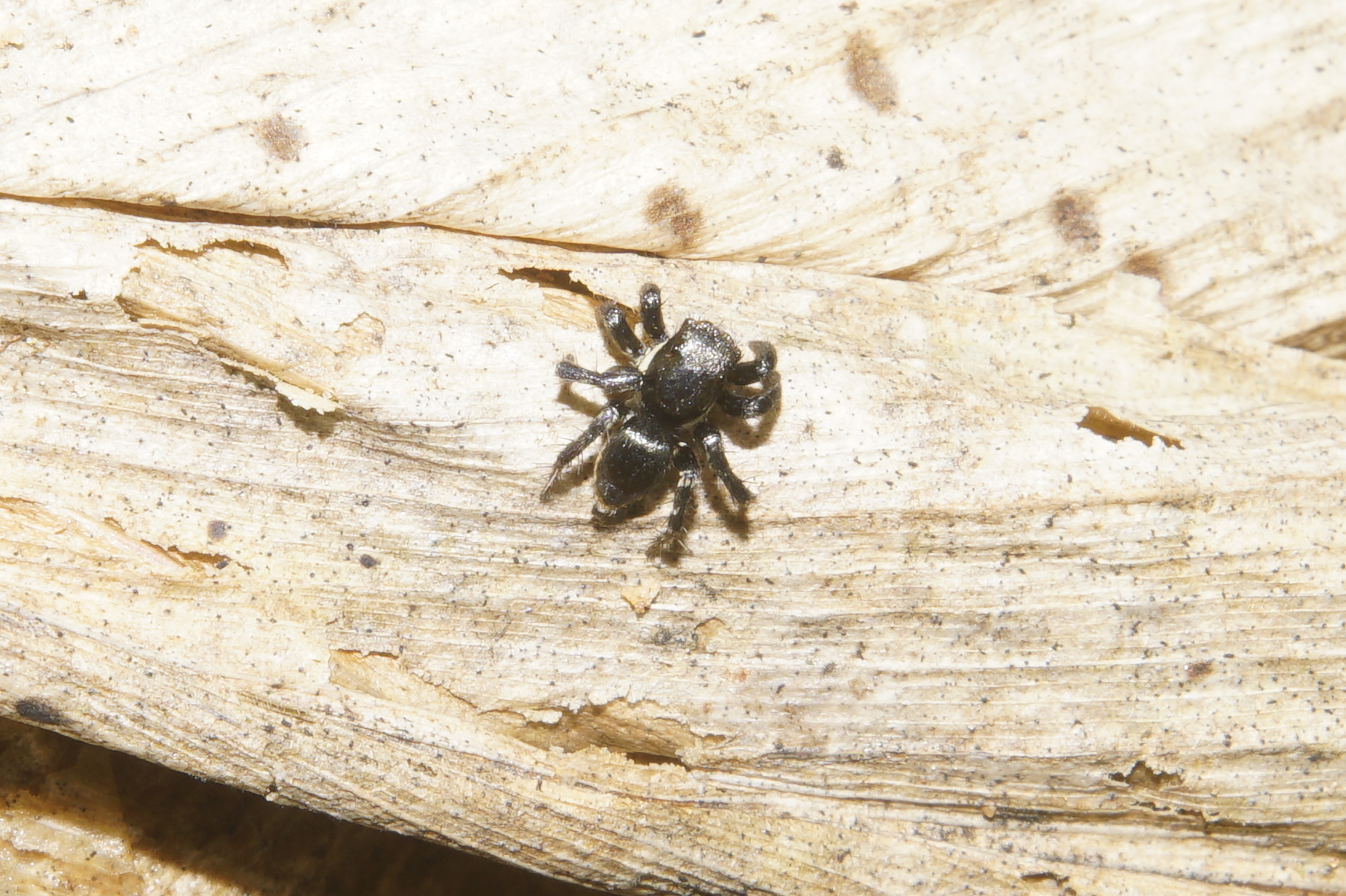
- A spider of the Stenaelurillus genus

Scientific classification
- Kingdom: Animalia
- Phylum: Arthropoda
- Subphylum: Chelicerata
- Class: Arachnida
- Order: Araneae
- Infraorder: Araneomorphae
- Family: Salticidae
- Genus: Stenaelurillus
- Species: S. ignobilis

Binomial name
- Stenaelurillus ignobilis Wesołowska & Cumming, 2011

= Stenaelurillus ignobilis =

Species of spider

Stenaelurillus ignobilis is a species of jumping spider in the genus Stenaelurillus that lives in Zimbabwe. The female was first described in 2011 by Wanda Wesołowska and Meg Cumming. The male has yet to be described. The spider takes its name from a Latin word that can be translated unsightly. The spider is medium-sized, with a carapace 2.6 mm (0.10 in) long and abdomen 3.4 mm (0.13 in) long. The carapace is brown, covered in bristles and has an almost indiscernible stripe, while the abdomen is larger and has a stripe of lighter brown down the middle of its generally darker, nearly black. The long spinnerets are also hairy while the legs have both hairs and spines. It is similar to Stenaelurillus mirabilis but can be distinguished by the design of the epigyne, and particularly the way that the gonopores are hidden in deep cup-like depressions.

== Taxonomy ==
Stenaelurillus ignobilis was first described by Wanda Wesołowska and Meg Cumming in 2011. It is one of over 500 species identified by the Polish arachnologist Wesołowska. It was placed in the genus Stenaelurillus, first raised by Eugène Simon in 1886. The genus name relates to the genus name Aelurillus, which itself derives from the Greek word for cat, with the addition of a Greek stem meaning narrow. It was placed in the subtribe Aelurillina in the tribe Aelurillini in the clade Saltafresia by Wayne Maddison in 2015. Two years later, in 2017, it was grouped with nine other genera of jumping spiders under the name Aelurillines. The species name is derived from the Latin word for unsightly.

== Description ==
Only the female has been described. The spider is medium-sized. The brown carapace is typically 2.6 mm (0.10 in) long and 2 mm (0.079 in) wide and is covered with long brown bristles. It has a pattern of light stripes on the darker thorax and white hairs around the eye field. The abdomen is a generally black with a lighter stripe that goes down the middle of it. It is covered with very light hairs, which are almost invisible, and long brown bristles along one edge. It is larger than the carapace and measures 3.4 mm (0.13 in) in length and 2.7 mm (0.11 in) in width. The clypeus is also fringed with white hairs, while the long spinnerets are covered in dark hairs. The legs are orange and have both brown hairs and spines. The epigyne has a distinctive arrangement of two round depressions that are situated close to each other and plugged with a waxy substance. The seminal ducts are short and recepticles rounded. The gonopores are hidden in deep impressions that are reminiscent of cups.

The species is very similar to other members of the genus, but can be distinguished by the structure of the epigyne. In particular, the spider is very similar to Stenaelurillus mirabilis from Tanzania, but the way that the gonopores are hidden enables them to be told apart.

== Distribution ==
The species is endemic to Zimbabwe. The holotype was identified in the Sengwa Wildlife Research Area based on a specimen collected by Meg Cumming between 2001 and 2002. It is known only from that local area.
