= Stenaelurillus setosus =

Scientific classification
- Kingdom: Animalia
- Phylum: Arthropoda
- Subphylum: Chelicerata
- Class: Arachnida
- Order: Araneae
- Infraorder: Araneomorphae
- Family: Salticidae
- Genus: Stenaelurillus
- Species: S. setosus

Binomial name
- Stenaelurillus setosus (Thorell, 1895) (nomen dubium)

Synonyms
- Philotherus setosus Thorell, 1895 (unavailable genus name); Philotheroides setosus Strand, 1934 (generic nomen novum)

Species of spider

Stenaelurillus setosus is a possible species of jumping spider from Myanmar and Thailand. It was described from a single immature male specimen. Stenaelurillus setosus was regarded as a nomen dubium (dubious name) by the World Spider Catalog as of January 2021.

== Description ==
The longish carapace is black with a dense black pubescence. The head part is rusty with a whitish curved stripe on each side. On the opisthosoma there is a wide transverse whitish band at the front and a narrower one near the spinnerets. In between the color is black with two light circular spots and some other white marks. Except for the mostly yellow tarsi, the legs are black.

== Taxonomy ==
The species was originally described as Philotherus setosus by Tamerlan Thorell in 1895. The genus name, Philotherus, was taken from Ancient Greek Φιλόθηρος ("fond of hunting"), taken from Persian mythology according to Thorell. However, the name Philotherus had already been used in 1855 for a genus of birds, and in 1934, Strand published the replacement name Philotheroides. In 1981, Jerzy Prószyński transferred it to the genus Stenaelurillus, but regarded it as a nomen dubium (dubious name).
