= Stenaelurillus fuscatus =

Scientific classification
- Kingdom: Animalia
- Phylum: Arthropoda
- Subphylum: Chelicerata
- Class: Arachnida
- Order: Araneae
- Infraorder: Araneomorphae
- Family: Salticidae
- Genus: Stenaelurillus
- Species: S. fuscatus

Binomial name
- Stenaelurillus fuscatus Wesołowska & Russell-Smith, 2000

Species of spider

Stenaelurillus fuscatus is a species of jumping spider in the genus Stenaelurillus that lives in Kenya and Tanzania. The species was first identified in 2000 by Wanda Wesołowska & Anthony Russell-Smith, and named for the Latin word for darkish. The spider is medium-sized with a carapace between 2.5 and 3.2 mm (0.098 and 0.126 in) long and an abdomen that is between 2.8 and 3.6 in (71 and 91 mm) in length. The female carapace is dark brown and has two white stripes and a pattern of a triangle and spots on the abdomen. The colouration is similarly dark but the patterns are less clear. The male abdomen is dominated by a dark scutum. The female is also darker overall, with brown rather than the yellow spinnerets and light brown chelicerae of the male. The male has a hook near the base of the embolus that differentiates it from other species in the genus, while the female's wide insemination ducts sets it apart from the similar Stenaelurillus darwini.

== Taxonomy ==
Stenaelurillus fuscatus is a species of jumping spider, a member of the family Salticidae, that was first described by the arachnologists Wanda Wesołowska & Anthony Russell-Smith in 2000. It was placed in the genus Stenaelurillus, first circumscribed by Eugène Simon in 1886. The genus name relates to the genus name Aelurillus, which itself derives from the Greek word for cat, with the addition of a Greek stem meaning narrow. The specific name is the Latin word that means darkish. The genus was placed in the subtribe Aelurillina in the tribe Aelurillini by Wayne Maddison in 2015, who listed the tribe in the clade Saltafresia. Two years later, in 2017, Jerzy Prószyński grouped it with nine other genera of jumping spiders under the name Aelurillines.

== Description ==
The spider is medium-sized. The spider's body is divided into two main parts: a pear-shaped cephalothorax and a more oval abdomen. The male has a carapace, the hard upper part of the cephalothorax, that is 2.6 mm (0.10 in) long and 2 mm (0.079 in) wide and an abdomen that is 2.8 mm (0.11 in) long and 2.0 mm (0.079 in) wide. The carapace is dark brown and has two faded white stripes on the thorax. The eye field is small, black and bristly. The underside of the cephalothorax, or sternum, is brownish-yellow or yellowish. The clypeus is brownish-yellow or light brown and has a covering of white and transparent hairs. The chelicerae are light brown and covered in short dark hairs. and there are two very small teeth visible at the front and one to the rear. The other mouthparts, the labium and maxillae, are orange.

The abdomen is very hairy, with dense long black hairs dominating, although there is a small corridor of white hairs on the dark brown scutum that covers the majority of the surface. Underneath, the abdomen is yellowish, but this is hard to see, as are the traces of three darker stripes. The spider has long hairy yellow spinnerets. The legs and pedipalps are brown, the pedipalps also having long black hairs. The legs have dense brown hairs and darker spines. The copulatory organs are distinctive. They are mainly covered in long dark hairs, although the cymbium has light hairs and the long flattened hairs are visible on the palpal tibia. There are also two protrusions, or apophysis, on the palpal tibia. The palpal bulb has a very large bulb at the rear while the embolus that emanates from it has a distinctive hook near the base. Other than the sexual organs, the male is similar to Stenaelurillus darwini and Stenaelurillus uniguttatus. They can be distinguished by the wide, square distal projection on the functional tegulum and the shape created by the black hairs on the palpal tibia.

The female is similar to the male in shape but slightly larger. The carapace is between 2.5 and 3.2 mm (0.098 and 0.126 in) long and between 1.95 and 2.35 mm (0.077 and 0.093 in) wide while the abdomen has a length between 3 and 3.6 in (76 and 91 mm) and width of 2.6 and 2.95 mm (0.102 and 0.116 in). The carapace is similar in colour to the male but the white stripes are more pronounced and extend onto the abdomen. The abdomen also has a more prominent pattern with a white triangular marking and oval spot formed of white scales. There are also numerous speckles visible underneath. The clypeus is yellow-brown but the chelicerae and legs are brown. The spinnerets also have a browner tint. Like the male, the female copulatory organs are characteristic. The epigyne is flat with a series of distinctive structures and a barely visible pocket. The copulatory openings are widely spaced and ovoid, and lead through very short and wide insemination ducts to ovoid spermathecae, or receptacles. The female can be distinguished from Stenaelurillus darwini by the wider insemination ducts. Compared to Stenaelurillus latibulbis, the copulatory organs lack sclerotization.

== Distribution and habitat ==
Stenaelurillus spiders have been found across Africa. Stenaelurillus fuscatus lives in Kenya and Tanzania. The holotype was found near the Umba River in the Tanzanian Mkomazi National Park in 1995. It was also subsequently found in the forests of Matthews Range and the coastal regions of Kenya. It has been found in exposed environments, like rocks, and amongst shrubland found near rivers.
