= Stenaelurillus brandbergensis =

Scientific classification
- Kingdom: Animalia
- Phylum: Arthropoda
- Subphylum: Chelicerata
- Class: Arachnida
- Order: Araneae
- Infraorder: Araneomorphae
- Family: Salticidae
- Genus: Stenaelurillus
- Species: S. brandbergensis

Binomial name
- Stenaelurillus brandbergensis (Wesołowska, 2006)

Synonyms
- Mashonarus brandbergensis Wesołowska, 2006

Species of jumping spider

Stenaelurillus brandbergensis, synonym Mashonarus brandbergensis, is a species of jumping spider in the genus Stenaelurillus that lives in Namibia. The spider is medium-sized and black, with a front section, or cephalothorax, that is between 1.7 and 2.0 mm (0.067 and 0.079 in) in length and, behind that, an abdomen that is between 1.6 and 2.9 mm (0.063 and 0.114 in) long. It is distinguished from other members of the genus by having two broad white stripes that mark the upper surface of both, particularly on its abdomen. The epigyne, the external visible part of the copulatory organs in the female, also has shorter insemination ducts than the otherwise similar, though larger, Stenaelurillus guttatus. First described in 2006 by Wanda Wesołowska and placed in the genus Mashonarus, the species was moved to its current genus in 2018.

== Taxonomy and etymology ==
Mashonarus brandbergensis is a species of jumping spider, a member of the family Salticidae that was first described by the arachnologistWanda Wesołowska in 2006. It is one of over 500 species identified by the Polish scientist. It was initially placed in the genus Mashonarus, which had been circumscribed by Wesołowska and Meg S. Cumming in 2002. The genus name was derived from Mashonaland, the area where it was first found. The spiders in the genus were medium-sized, between 4.2 and 7.0 mm (0.17 and 0.28 in) in length, and were differentiated by their sexual organs. At the time, the species was seen as very similar to Stenaelurillus, particularly in the structure of the epigyne and the shield-like shape of and patterns on the abdomen.

The species was moved to Stenaelurillus by Dmitri Logunov and Galina Azarkina in 2018. Stenaelurillus had been first raised by Eugène Simon in 1885. The genus name relates to the genus name Aelurillus, which itself derives from the Greek word for cat, with the addition of a Greek stem meaning narrow. In 2017, it was grouped with nine other genera of jumping spiders under the name Aelurillines. Wayne Maddison has been placed it in the subtribe Aelurillina in the tribe Aelurillini in the clade Saltafresia. The specific name is derived from the place where it was first found, the Brandberg Mountain.

== Description ==
The spider is medium-sized and has a body that is divided into two main parts: a pear-shaped cephalothorax and an oval abdomen. It is generally similar to Stenaelurillus guttatus although smaller and marked with a different pattern on its abdomen. The male has a cephalothorax that measures between 1.7 and 1.9 mm (0.067 and 0.075 in) in length and between 1.2 and 1.3 mm (0.047 and 0.051 in) in width. It has a black, medium high carapace, the hard upper part of the cephalothorax, which is marked with a pattern of two wide stripes that run from the front to the back and has white edges. It is covered in brown hairs. Its eye field is short, about a half the size of its thorax, and has a covering of dense long bristles. There are some white hairs near the eyes on some of the specimens found. The underside of the cephalothorax, or sternum, is oval and dark brown.

The part of the spider's face known as its clypeus is low and brown with a few white hairs found on it. Its chelicerae is dark brown with two teeth towards the front and a single small tooth to the rear. Its remaining mouthparts, its labium and maxillae are brown with, in some cases, yellowish tips. The male's abdomen is black and hairy, between 1.6 and 2.1 mm (0.063 and 0.083 in) long and 1.2 and 1.4 mm (0.047 and 0.055 in) wide. Its front edge is straight. Some specimens have a small delicate hard scutum on its back. On its topside, its has a pattern of two wide stripes similar to its carapace. Sometimes these are broken into three patches. This most distinguishes the species from Stenaelurillus guttatus and other members of the genus in Africa. Only Stenaelurillus marusiki, found in Iran, has a similar design. The surface is covered in dense hairs of the same colour as the pattern. The underside of the spider's abdomen is yellowish.

The female is similar to the male in shape but slightly larger. It has an cephalothorax 1.9 to 2.0 mm (0.075 to 0.079 in) long and 1.4 to 2.1 mm (0.055 to 0.083 in) wide and an abdomen that is between 1.8 and 2.9 in (46 and 74 mm) long and 1.4 to 2.2 mm (0.055 to 0.087 in) wide. The colouring is similar but its abdomen lacks the scutum on the male's abdomen. Its legs are yellow with brownish rings and patches. In contrast, the male has light brown legs with yellowish parts. Its leg hairs are brown and its book lung covers are yellow. Both the male and female spider's spinnerets are long and yellowish with darker tips.

The spider's copulatory organs are distinctive. Its pedipalps are small, dark brown or black with some small white hairs. The male's palpal tibia has a projection, known as its tibial apophysis, that is curved and very thin. Its pedipalp end in a narrow cymbium with a small curved spike at the bottom. Its long palpal bulb has a bulge at the bottom and a very short embolus the projects from a lump at the top. The female's epigyne, the external visible part of its copulatory organs, is small with lateral copulatory openings and very short insemination ducts that lead to spherical spermathecae, or receptacles. Apart from the striped pattern, it is the very short insemination ducts that most distinguish the species from Stenaelurillus guttatus.

== Distribution ==
The species was first identified in the area around the Brandberg Mountain in Namibia. It is endemic to the country. It is one of the most common jumping spiders found in the area.
