= Stenaelurillus guttatus =

Scientific classification
- Kingdom: Animalia
- Phylum: Arthropoda
- Subphylum: Chelicerata
- Class: Arachnida
- Order: Araneae
- Infraorder: Araneomorphae
- Family: Salticidae
- Genus: Stenaelurillus
- Species: S. guttatus

Binomial name
- Stenaelurillus guttatus (Wesołowska & Cumming, 2002)

Synonyms
- Mashonarus guttatus Wesołowska & Cumming, 2002

Species of spider

Stenaelurillus guttatus, synonym Mashonarus guttatus, is a species of jumping spider in the genus Stenaelurillus that lives in Botswana, Zambia and Zimbabwe. It was first described in 2002 by Wanda Wesołowska and Meg S. Cumming. It was initially the type species for the genus Mashonarus but was moved to its current genus in 2018. The spider is medium-sized, with a cephalothorax that is between 2.1 and 2.7 mm (0.083 and 0.106 in) long and 2.0 mm (0.079 in) and an abdomen that is between 2.3 and 3.8 mm (0.091 and 0.150 in) long. It is very dark in colour, either dark brown or black, and has a distinctive pattern on its back consisting of two white stripes on the thorax and three sets of two white patches on the abdomen. This pattern gives the species its name, which is based on a Latin word that can be translated spotted. It lives in a wide range of environments, from dry to wet climates, and at altitudes between 500 and 1,500 m (1,600 and 4,900 ft) above sea level. First observed in a garden, the spider has been found under logs, stones and rocks, in leaf litter, and, after rains, on grass, shrubs and garden walls. It feeds on termites, particularly Odontotermes transvaalensis, and other prey including fruit flies and leafhoppers.

== Taxonomy ==
Mashonarus guttatus was first described by Wanda Wesołowska and Meg S. Cumming in 2002. It is one of over 500 species identified by the Polish arachnologist Wesołowska. It was initially placed in the genus Mashonarus, which was created at the same time, as the type species. The genus name was derived from Mashonaland, the area where it was first found. The spiders in the genus were medium-sized, between 4.2 and 7.0 mm (0.17 and 0.28 in) in length, and were differentiated by their sexual organs. At the time, the species was seen as very similar to Stenaelurillus, particularly in the structure of the epigyne and the shield-like shape of and patterns on the abdomen.

The spider was moved to Stenaelurillus by Dmitri Logunov and Galina N. Azarkina in 2018, and split into two different species, Stenaelurillus guttatus and a new species Stenaelurillus pseudoguttatus. Stenaelurillus had been first raised by Eugène Simon in 1886. The genus name relates to the genus name Aelurillus, which itself derives from the Greek word for cat, with the addition of a Greek stem meaning narrow. It was placed in the subtribe Aelurillina in the tribe Aelurillini by Wayne Maddison in 2015, who listed the tribe in the clade Saltafresia. Two years later, in 2017, it was grouped with nine other genera of jumping spiders under the name Aelurillines. The species name is derived from a Latin word that can be translated spotted and recalls the distinctive pattern of colours that can be seen on the species.

== Description ==
The spider is medium-sized and has an overall shape that is typical for the genus. The cephalothorax is typically 2.7 mm (0.11 in) long and 2.0 mm (0.079 in) wide, while the abdomen is 2.5 mm (0.098 in) long and 1.9 mm (0.075 in) wide. The spider has a pear-shaped dark brown or black carapace and oval or shield-shaped abdomen have a distinctive colouration and pattern. The carapace has two slightly curved stripes formed of white hairs that cross the thorax while the abdomen has a pattern of three sets of two white patches made up of small scales. There is another small patch at the end of the abdomen, near the spinnerets. The spinnerets are brownish or grey, legs brown or yellow and the chelicerae dark brown. The eye field is black. As well as the colouration, it is distinguished from other members of the genus by the design of the sexual organs, including its stilleto-shaped embolus.

The female is similar to the male but with a larger abdomen. It has a cephalothorax that measures between 2.1 and 2.6 mm (0.083 and 0.102 in) in length and between 1.6 and 2.0 mm (0.063 and 0.079 in) in width. The abdomen measures between 2.3 and 3.8 mm (0.091 and 0.150 in) in length and between 1.6 and 2.6 mm (0.063 and 0.102 in) in width. The colours are very similar and the patterns are often richer with additional white patches on the sides of the spider. The epigyne is very small with a raised area in the middle. It has lateral copulatory openings. The openings are small, round and widely separated, with comparatively long insemination ducts. It is very similar to the species Stenaelurillus brandbergensis and Stenaelurillus pseudoguttatus. As well as the colouration, it can be distinguished by the length of the insemination ducts.

== Behaviour ==
The spider is a specialised hunter of Odontotermes termites, particularly Odontotermes transvaalensis, seeking out prey in the leaf litter that lays on top of termite mounds. The spider has been observed particularly seeking out new areas of termite construction, and grabbing termite workers even when they attempt to defend themselves. The spider shows a tendency to avoid members of the soldier caste. The species also feeds on other prey, including fruit flies and leafhoppers.

Stenaelurillus guttatus has been found to nest and produce juveniles between September and November. Between December and March, they remain hidden until the mating season, at the end of the wet season in April. Although some of the adults from the previous season survived until the juveniles hatched, there was no overlap between the adult generations.

== Distribution and habitat ==
The species was first identified in Harare, Zimbabwe, based on specimens collected in a garden in 1992. Both a holotype male and paratype female were collected. The species was also identified in Botswana, near Francistown, and Harry Mwanga Nkumbula International Airport in Zambia. An example initially identified as the species from Namibia was found to be misnamed.

The spider lives in diverse habitats. It has been identified under logs, stones and rocks. It lives in leaf litter and, after rain has fallen, can be found on grass, shrubs and garden walls. It thrives in both dry and wet climates, at altitudes between 500 and 1,500 m (1,600 and 4,900 ft) above sea level.
