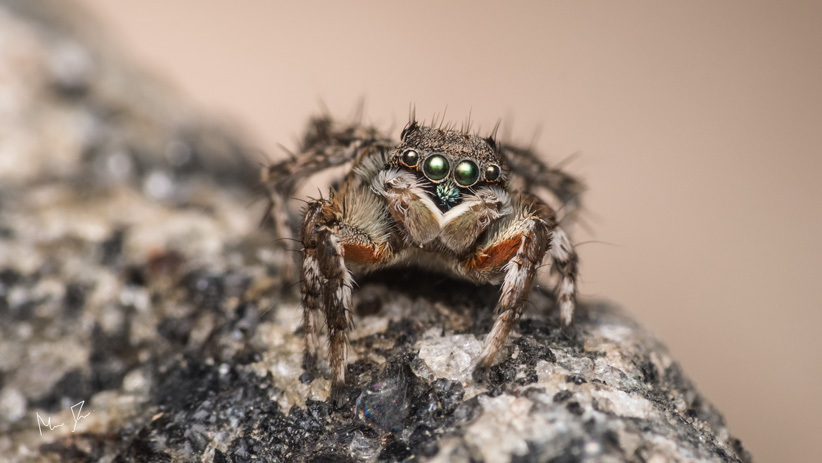

Scientific classification
- Kingdom: Animalia
- Phylum: Arthropoda
- Subphylum: Chelicerata
- Class: Arachnida
- Order: Araneae
- Infraorder: Araneomorphae
- Family: Salticidae
- Genus: Stenaelurillus
- Species: S. megamalai

Binomial name
- Stenaelurillus megamalai Sudhin, Sen & Caleb, 2023

= Stenaelurillus megamalai =

Species of spider

Stenaelurillus megamalai is a species of jumping spider found in southern India. The males have distinct three sub-equal white spots arranged in a transverse row on the abdomen. The species is named after the Megamalai Wildlife Sanctuary from where it was collected.

== Behaviour ==
Male Stenaelurillus megamalai performs an elaborate visual courtship display notable for rapid body movements and strong colour contrasts. The display typically begins with an up-and-down motion while the male holds its pedipalps together in front of the chelicerae and raises legs I to show bright orange patches on the femora. Males then perform one of two distinctive actions: either a rapid, peacock-like rearing and lateral expansion of a fringed opisthosoma, or a sudden elevation of the entire body with legs I and II extended forward and the body supported only on legs III and IV. During these displays the male exposes bright white stripes on the prolateral side of the pedipalps, tufts of light-blue setae between the pedipalps, and contrasting white dorsal spots on a dark opisthosoma, all of which enhance the visual signal to the female.

== Distinctiveness ==
The combination of rapid elevation maneuvers, pronounced opisthosomal fringes, and the specific suite of contrasting colour features (white palpal stripes, blue setal tufts and three dorsal white spots) distinguishes S. megamalai from other Indian members of Stenaelurillus, for which comparable courtship sequences have not been documented in the field.
