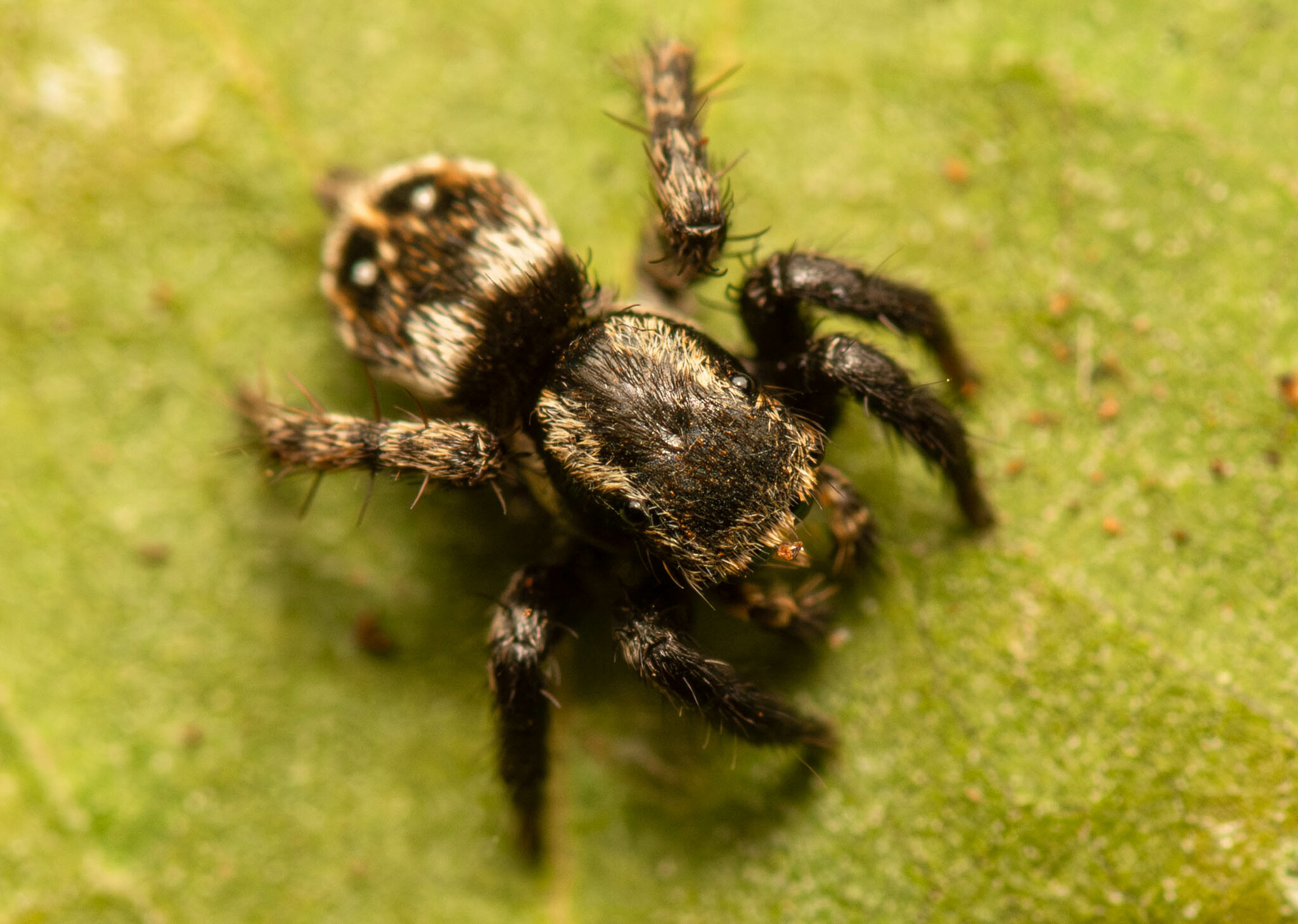
- female S. modestus
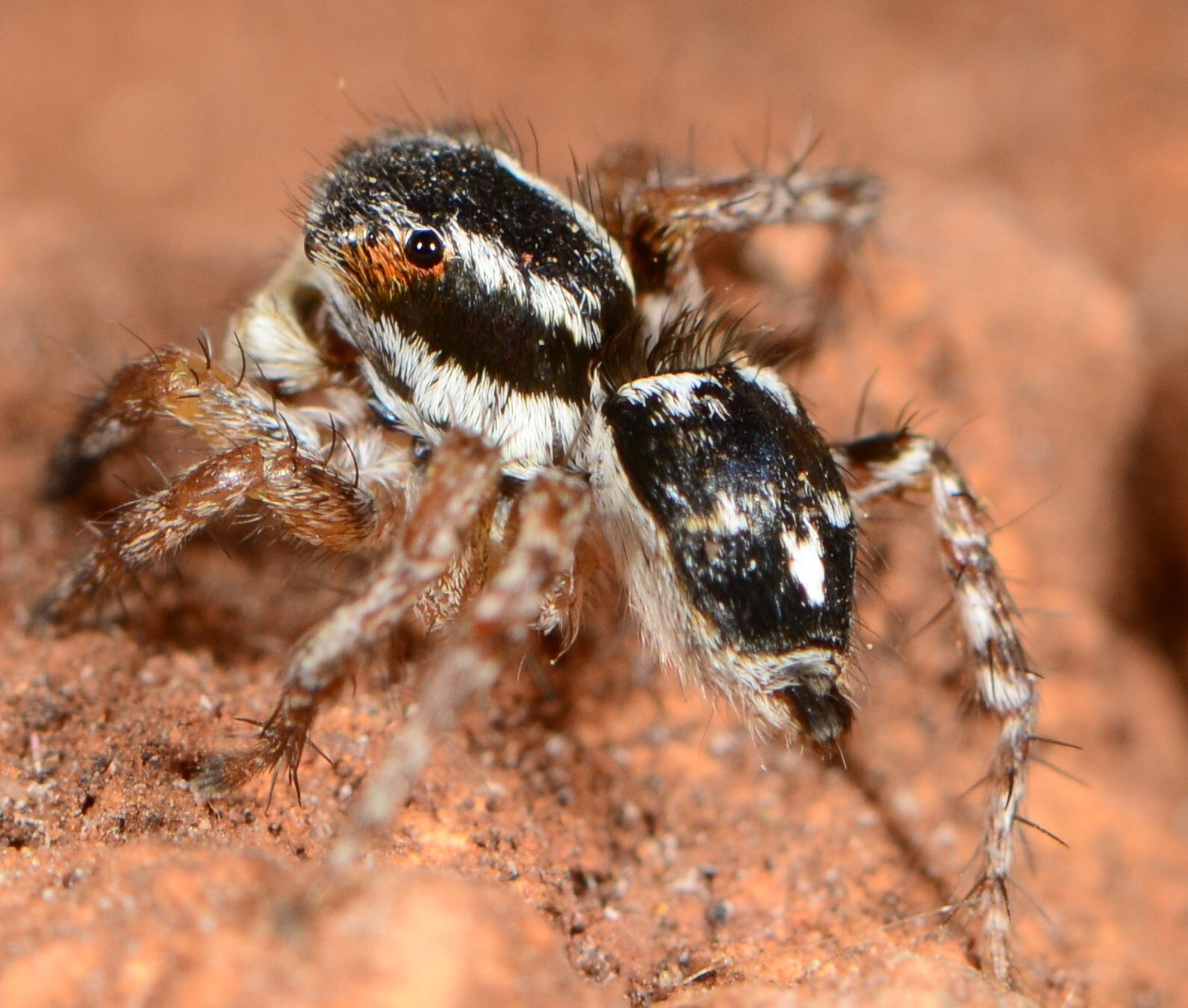
- male S. guttiger

Scientific classification
- Kingdom: Animalia
- Phylum: Arthropoda
- Subphylum: Chelicerata
- Class: Arachnida
- Order: Araneae
- Infraorder: Araneomorphae
- Family: Salticidae
- Subfamily: Salticinae
- Genus: Stenaelurillus; Simon, 1886

Type species
- S. nigricaudus Simon, 1886

Species
- 59, see text

Synonyms
- Mashonarus Wesołowska & Cumming, 2002; Microheros Wesołowska & Cumming, 1999; Philotheroides Strand, 1934

= Stenaelurillus =

Genus of spiders

Stenaelurillus is a genus of jumping spiders that was first described by Eugène Louis Simon in 1886. Most species live in Africa, with some species found in Asia, including China. All species have two white longitudinal stripes on the carapace, and both sexes show strong bristles around the eyes.

The name is a combination of the Greek sten- "narrow" and the salticid genus Aelurillus.

== Species ==
As of October 2025, this genus includes 59 species:

- Stenaelurillus abramovi Logunov, 2008 – Thailand, Vietnam
- Stenaelurillus albopunctatus Caporiacco, 1949 – Kenya
- Stenaelurillus albus Sebastian, Sankaran, Malamel & Joseph, 2015 – India
- Stenaelurillus arambagensis (B. Biswas & K. Biswas, 1992) – Pakistan, India
- Stenaelurillus bandama Logunov & Azarkina, 2018 – Ivory Coast
- Stenaelurillus belihuloya Logunov & Azarkina, 2018 – Sri Lanka
- Stenaelurillus brandbergensis (Wesołowska, 2006) – Namibia
- Stenaelurillus darwini Wesołowska & Russell-Smith, 2000 – Tanzania, Kenya
- Stenaelurillus feral Tripathi, Kuni & Kadam, 2024 – India
- Stenaelurillus furcatus Wesołowska, 2014 – Namibia
- Stenaelurillus fuscatus Wesołowska & Russell-Smith, 2000 – Kenya, Tanzania
- Stenaelurillus fuscus Cao & Li, 2016 – China
- Stenaelurillus gabrieli Prajapati, Murthappa, Sankaran & Sebastian, 2016 – India
- Stenaelurillus glaber Wesołowska & Russell-Smith, 2011 – Ivory Coast, Ghana, Nigeria, Uganda
- Stenaelurillus guttatus (Wesołowska & Cumming, 2002) – Namibia, Zambia, Botswana, Zimbabwe, Mozambique
- Stenaelurillus guttiger (Simon, 1901) – Botswana, Zimbabwe, Mozambique, South Africa
- Stenaelurillus hirsutus Lessert, 1927 – Senegal, Ghana, DR Congo, Central Africa, Uganda, Tanzania, Kenya
- Stenaelurillus ignobilis Wesołowska & Cumming, 2011 – Zimbabwe
- Stenaelurillus ilesai Kanesharatnam & Benjamin, 2020 – Sri Lanka
- Stenaelurillus indicus Logunov, 2020 – India
- Stenaelurillus iubatus Wesołowska & Russell-Smith, 2011 – Ghana, Nigeria
- Stenaelurillus jocquei Logunov & Azarkina, 2018 – Cameroon
- Stenaelurillus judithbleisterae Kadam, Tripathi & Kuni, 2024 – India
- Stenaelurillus kavango Wesołowska, 2014 – Namibia
- Stenaelurillus kronestedti Próchniewicz & Heçiak, 1994 – Tanzania
- Stenaelurillus latibulbis Wesołowska, 2014 – DR Congo, Zambia
- Stenaelurillus lesserti Reimoser, 1934 – India, Sri Lanka
- Stenaelurillus leucogrammus Simon, 1902 – Zimbabwe, Mozambique
- Stenaelurillus mardanicus Ali & Maddison, 2018 – Pakistan
- Stenaelurillus marusiki Logunov, 2001 – Iran, India
- Stenaelurillus megamalai Sudhin, Sen & Caleb, 2023 – India
- Stenaelurillus metallicus Caleb & Mathai, 2016 – India
- Stenaelurillus minutus Song & Chai, 1991 – China (Hainan)
- Stenaelurillus mirabilis Wesołowska & Russell-Smith, 2000 – Tanzania, Kenya
- Stenaelurillus modestus Wesołowska, 2014 – South Africa
- Stenaelurillus naldurg Kuni, Kadam & Tripathi, 2024 – India
- Stenaelurillus neyyar Sudhin, Sen & Caleb, 2023 – India
- Stenaelurillus nigricaudus Simon, 1886 – Algeria, Gambia, Senegal, Mali, Niger, Burkina Faso (type species)
- Stenaelurillus pecten Wesołowska, 2014 – Botswana, Zambia
- Stenaelurillus pilosus Wesołowska & Russell-Smith, 2011 – Nigeria
- Stenaelurillus pseudoguttatus Logunov & Azarkina, 2018 – Namibia
- Stenaelurillus sarojinae Caleb & Mathai, 2014 – India
- Stenaelurillus senegalensis Logunov & Azarkina, 2018 – Senegal
- Stenaelurillus shwetamukhi Marathe, Sanap, & Maddison, 2022 – India
- Stenaelurillus siyamae Logunov & Azarkina, 2018 – Sudan
- Stenaelurillus solapur Kuni, Tripathi & Kadam, 2024 – India
- Stenaelurillus specularis Wesołowska, 2014 – Malawi
- Stenaelurillus strandi Caporiacco, 1939 – Ethiopia
- Stenaelurillus striolatus Wesołowska & Russell-Smith, 2011 – Nigeria
- Stenaelurillus sudanicus Wesołowska, 2014 – Sudan
- Stenaelurillus tamravarni Marathe & Maddison, 2022 – India
- Stenaelurillus termitophagus (Wesołowska & Cumming, 1999) – Namibia, Botswana, Mozambique, South Africa
- Stenaelurillus tettu Logunov, 2020 – India
- Stenaelurillus triguttatus Simon, 1886 – Nepal, China
- Stenaelurillus uniguttatus Lessert, 1925 – Ethiopia, Kenya, Tanzania
- Stenaelurillus vyaghri Sanap, Joglekar, & Caleb, 2022 – India
- Stenaelurillus wa Wawer & Wesołowska, 2025 – Ghana
- Stenaelurillus wandae Logunov, 2020 – India
- Stenaelurillus zambiensis Wesołowska, 2014 – Malawi, Zambia, Zimbabwe

=== Nomina dubia ===
- Stenaelurillus giovae Caporiacco, 1936
- Stenaelurillus setosus (Thorell, 1895)
