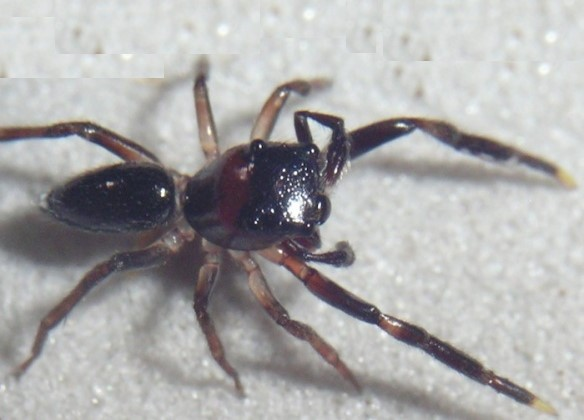
- Spider in the genus Tisaniba

Scientific classification
- Kingdom: Animalia
- Phylum: Arthropoda
- Subphylum: Chelicerata
- Class: Arachnida
- Order: Araneae
- Infraorder: Araneomorphae
- Family: Salticidae
- Subfamily: Salticinae
- Genus: Tisaniba; Maddison

Type species
- Tisaniba mulu

Species
- 6, see text

= Tisaniba =

Genus of spiders

Tisaniba is a genus of spiders in the family Salticidae. It was first described in 2014 by Zhang & Maddison. As of 2017, it contains 6 species, all found in Borneo.

== Species ==
Tisaniba comprises the following species:

- Tisaniba bijibijan Zhang & Maddison, 2014
- Tisaniba dik Zhang & Maddison, 2014
- Tisaniba kubah Zhang & Maddison, 2014
- Tisaniba mulu Zhang & Maddison, 2014
- Tisaniba selan Zhang & Maddison, 2014
- Tisaniba selasi Zhang & Maddison, 2014
