= Kovalius =

Scientific classification
- Kingdom: Animalia
- Phylum: Arthropoda
- Subphylum: Chelicerata
- Class: Arachnida
- Order: Opiliones
- Family: Sclerosomatidae
- Subfamily: Leiobuninae
- Genus: Kovalius; Chemeris, 2023
- Species: K. logunovi

Binomial name
- Kovalius logunovi Chemeris, 2023

Genus of harvestmen

Kovalius is a monotypic genus of harvestmen in the family Sclerosomatidae. This genus has a single species, Kovalius logunovi, found in Southern Russia, in the Northwest Caucasus.
