= Stenaelurillus mirabilis =

Scientific classification
- Kingdom: Animalia
- Phylum: Arthropoda
- Subphylum: Chelicerata
- Class: Arachnida
- Order: Araneae
- Infraorder: Araneomorphae
- Family: Salticidae
- Genus: Stenaelurillus
- Species: S. mirabilis

Binomial name
- Stenaelurillus mirabilis Wesołowska & Russell-Smith, 2000

Species of spider

Stenaelurillus mirabilis is a species of jumping spider in the genus Stenaelurillus that lives in Kenya and Tanzania. It lives in forests and grassland, including woodland of Acacia senegal trees, and is particularly abundant in the Mkomazi National Park. The spider is medium-sized, with a dark brown front section, or carapace, between 1.75 and 2.7 mm (0.069 and 0.106 in) in length that has two white stripes across its length and, behind that, a black abdomen between 1.9 and 2.8 mm (0.075 and 0.110 in) long. The female abdomen has orange sides and a white marking of a single stripe interrupted by other marks. The male abdomen has a white cross shape formed of five spors. It is distinguished from other members of the genus by its copulatory organs, in particular the male's long, thin palpal bulb and the female's flat epigyne with its short and slightly bent insemination ducts. The species was first described in 2000 by Wanda Wesołowska and Anthony Russell-Smith.

== Taxonomy ==
Stenaelurillus mirabilis species of jumping spider, a member of the family Salticidae, that was first described by the arachnologists Wanda Wesołowska and Anthony Russell-Smith in 2000. It is one of over 500 species identified by the Polish arachnologist Wesołowska. It was placed in the genus Stenaelurillus, first raised by Eugène Simon in 1885. The name relates to the genus name Aelurillus, which itself derives from the Greek word for cat, with the addition of a prefix meaning narrow. The species name is a Latin word that can be translated wonderful. In 2015, the genus was placed in the subtribe Aelurillina in the tribe Aelurillini in the clade Saltafresia by Wayne Maddison. Two years later, it was grouped with nine other genera of jumping spiders under the name Aelurillines. The holotype is stored at the Royal Museum for Central Africa in Tervuren.

== Description ==
The spider is medium-sized. The male has a dark brown pear-shaped carapace, the front portion of its body, that measures between 1.75 and 1.9 mm (0.069 and 0.075 in) in length and between 1.33 and 1.4 mm (0.052 and 0.055 in) in width, with two long white stripes on the thorax and one wide white stripe along each edge. The eye field is dark, nearly black, and has short protruding bristles. The part of the underside of this front portion called the sternum is light yellow or yellow and often has white hairs on it. In Tanzanian specimen, it's clypeus and cheeks are also yellow and have a small number of long orange hairs. Kenyan spiders have a brown clypeus. Their mouthparts also differ. Kenyan specimen have light brown chelicerae with a single tooth at the front and two at the back, the remaining mouthparts, their labium and maxillae, being orange. In Tanzanian spiders, they are all light yellow.

Behind its carapace, the male has a black and hairy abdomen, between 1.9 and 2.0 mm (0.075 and 0.079 in) long and 1.2 and 1.23 mm (0.047 and 0.048 in) wide, that has a pattern of a cross-shape formed of five white spots. Its book lung covers are yellow with a hint of brown and its spinnerets are long and white, some having brown tips. The spider's legs are brown and yellow and its pedipalps are light yellow or orange.

Its copulatory organs are distinctive. It has a simple cymbium that lacks any appendages. It is similar in size to its small tegulum, which is similarly simple, but has a more elongated shape, including a tubercle at its bottom near to a slightly curved spike. There is a shorter spike, called a tibial apophysis, on the palpal tibia along with a small under-developed projection called a ventral tibial apophysis. At the other end, near the top, of the tegulum, there is another spike, called an embolus. This is short and projects slightly into the spider's cymbium. The species can be distinguished from other members of the genus by its long thin palpal bulb, its tubercle at the very end, and its short embolus.

The female is very similar to the male in colouration and shape, but is larger. Its carapace is between 2.0 and 2.05 mm (0.079 and 0.081 in) long and 1.6 and 1.7 mm (0.063 and 0.067 in) wide. Its carapace is also pear-shaped and dark brown or black, and has two white stripes on the thorax. Its eye field is black and have a field of short protruding bristles. Its sternum is light brown. Its clypeus and chelicerae are brown, the latter having two teeth to the front and one to the rear. Its labium and maxillae are light brown.

The female's abdomen is also larger than the male's, between 2.3 and 2.9 in (58 and 74 mm) long and 1.7 and 1.95 mm (0.067 and 0.077 in) wide. It has a white stripe in the middle which stretches from the front to back, interrupted by two white marks in the middle and ends. There is a wide dark brown rectangle either side of the stripe, the whole of it covered in a dense cover of white and brown hairs. The edges of the abdomen are orange and the lighter parts have an orange shine. The underside of its abdomen is light and has a small number of dots to its sides. Some of the spiders have brown speckles on the edge of their abdomen. They have yellow spinnerets. Its legs are yellowish with dark rings and patches, the third pair being longer than the others. They have long brown leg hairs and spines.

The female's copulatory organs are also distinctive. Its epigyne, the external visible part of its copulatory organs, is small and flat with a rear edge that shows signs of sclerotization. There are two widely separated copulatory openings that look like two sclerotized round plates. These lead via short, slightly bent insemination ducts that run shallow to spherical spermathecae, or receptacles. The conformation of both the epigyne and the spermathecae are particularly distinguishing for the species. The lack of gonopores in the epigyne particularly distinguishes the species from the otherwise similar Stenaelurillus ignobilis.

== Distribution ==
Stenaelurillus spiders have been found across Africa. Stenaelurillus mirabilis lives in Tanzania and Kenya. The holotype was found near the Ibaya camp in the Mkomazi National Park in 1993. Many other examples were found across the reserve, in a range of habitats including Acacia senegal woodland, Combretum bushland and grassland. At the time, it was the most abundant ground-active salticid in the reserve. It was also subsequently found in the forests of the Tsavo East National Park in the coastal regions of Kenya.
