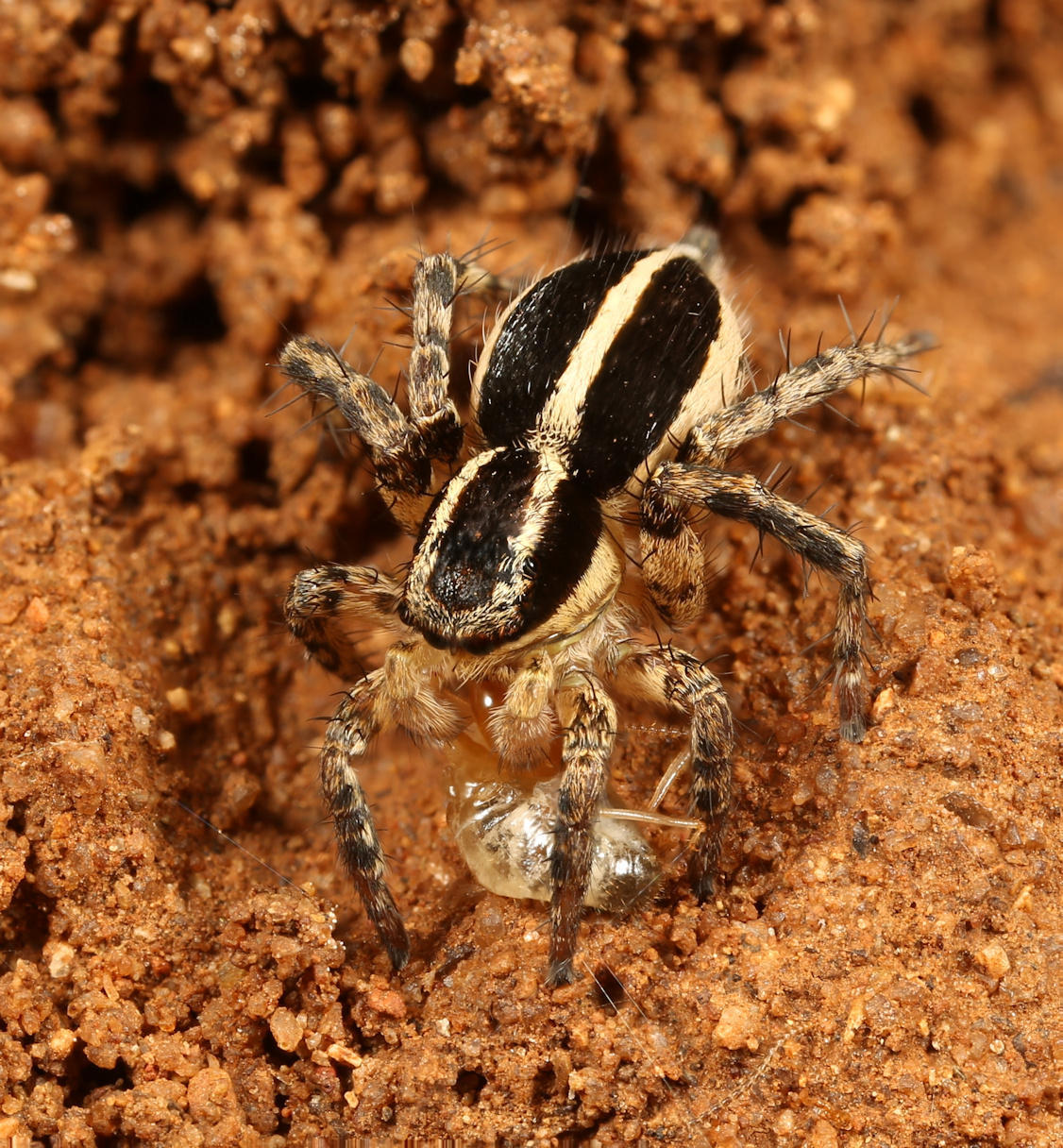

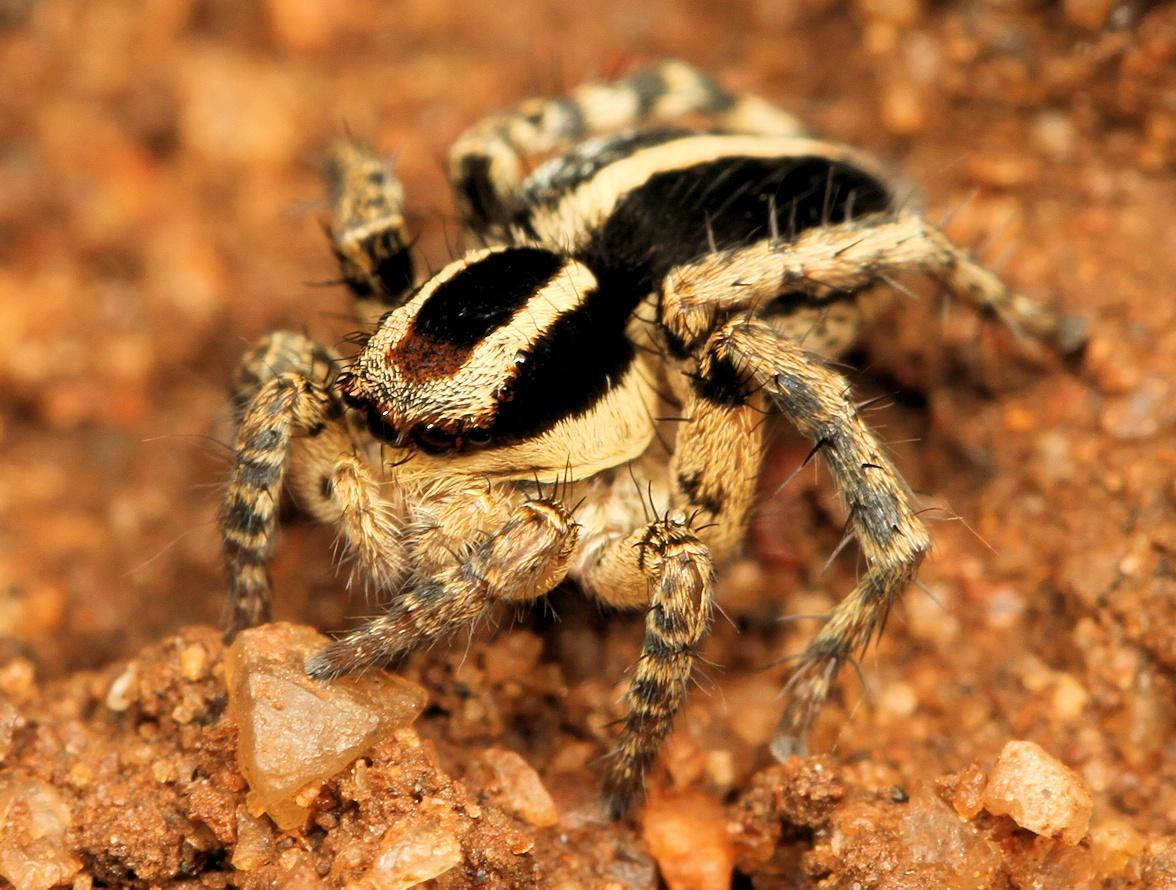

Scientific classification
- Kingdom: Animalia
- Phylum: Arthropoda
- Subphylum: Chelicerata
- Class: Arachnida
- Order: Araneae
- Infraorder: Araneomorphae
- Family: Salticidae
- Genus: Stenaelurillus
- Species: S. termitophagus

Binomial name
- Stenaelurillus termitophagus (Wesołowsk & Cumming, 1999)

Synonyms
- Microheros termitophagus Wesołowska & Cumming, 1999

= Stenaelurillus termitophagus =

Species of spider

Stenaelurillus termitophagus is a species of spider in the jumping spider family Salticidae, found in Southern Africa (Namibia, Botswana, South Africa).
