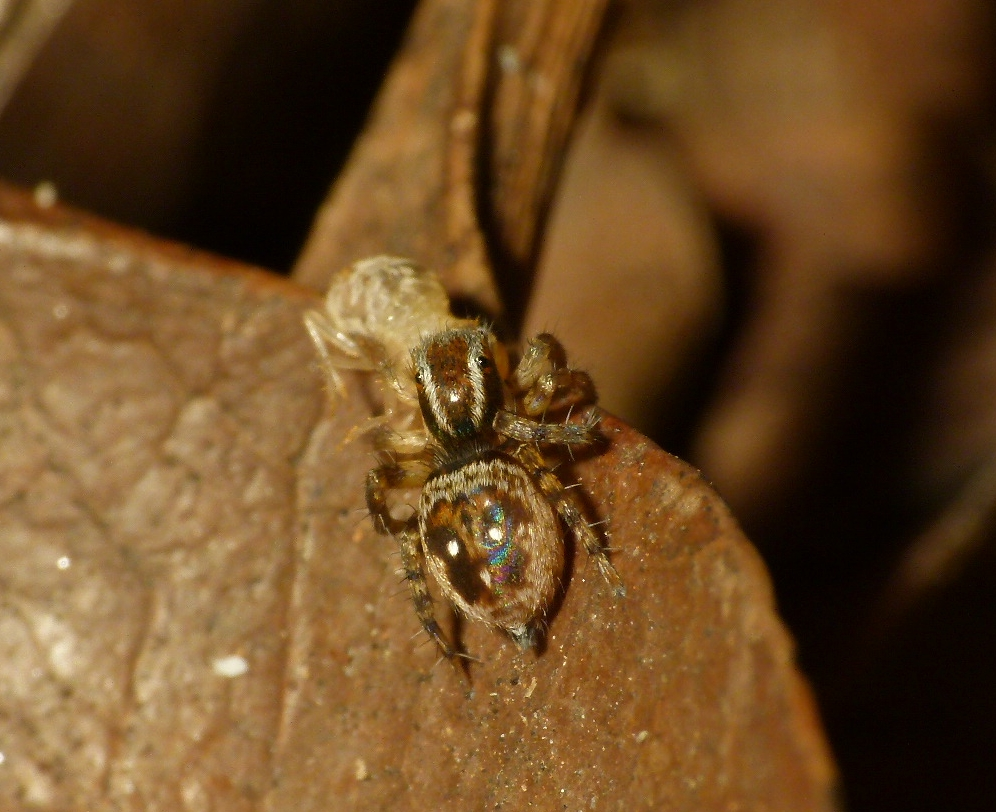

Scientific classification
- Kingdom: Animalia
- Phylum: Arthropoda
- Subphylum: Chelicerata
- Class: Arachnida
- Order: Araneae
- Infraorder: Araneomorphae
- Family: Salticidae
- Genus: Stenaelurillus
- Species: S. lesserti

Binomial name
- Stenaelurillus lesserti Reimoser, 1934

= Stenaelurillus lesserti =

Species of spider

Stenaelurillus lesserti is a species of jumping spider found in southern India and Sri Lanka. The male has red and blue horizontal stripes on the front of the face while the female is dull. There are two transverse stripes on the prosoma.

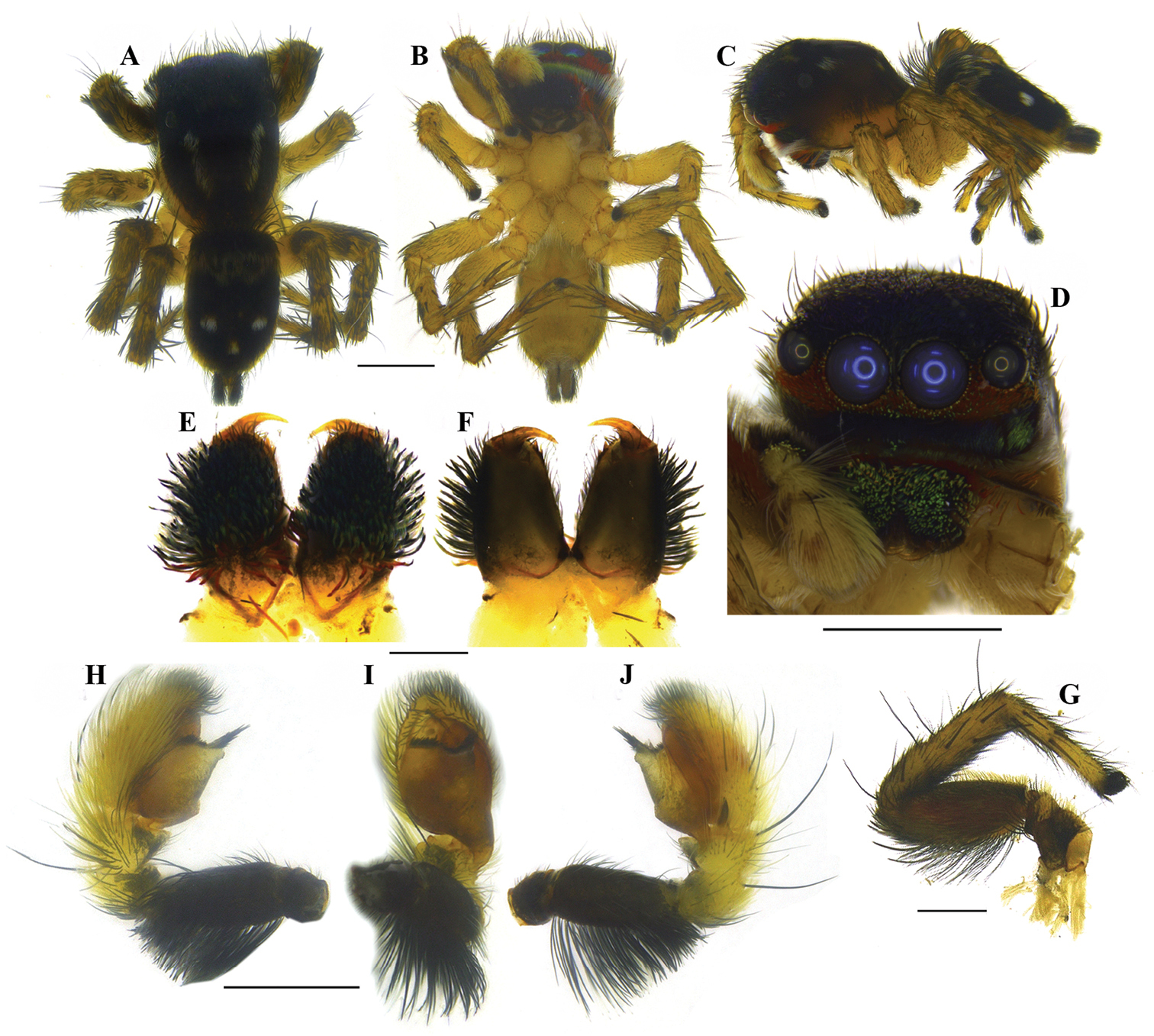
Male

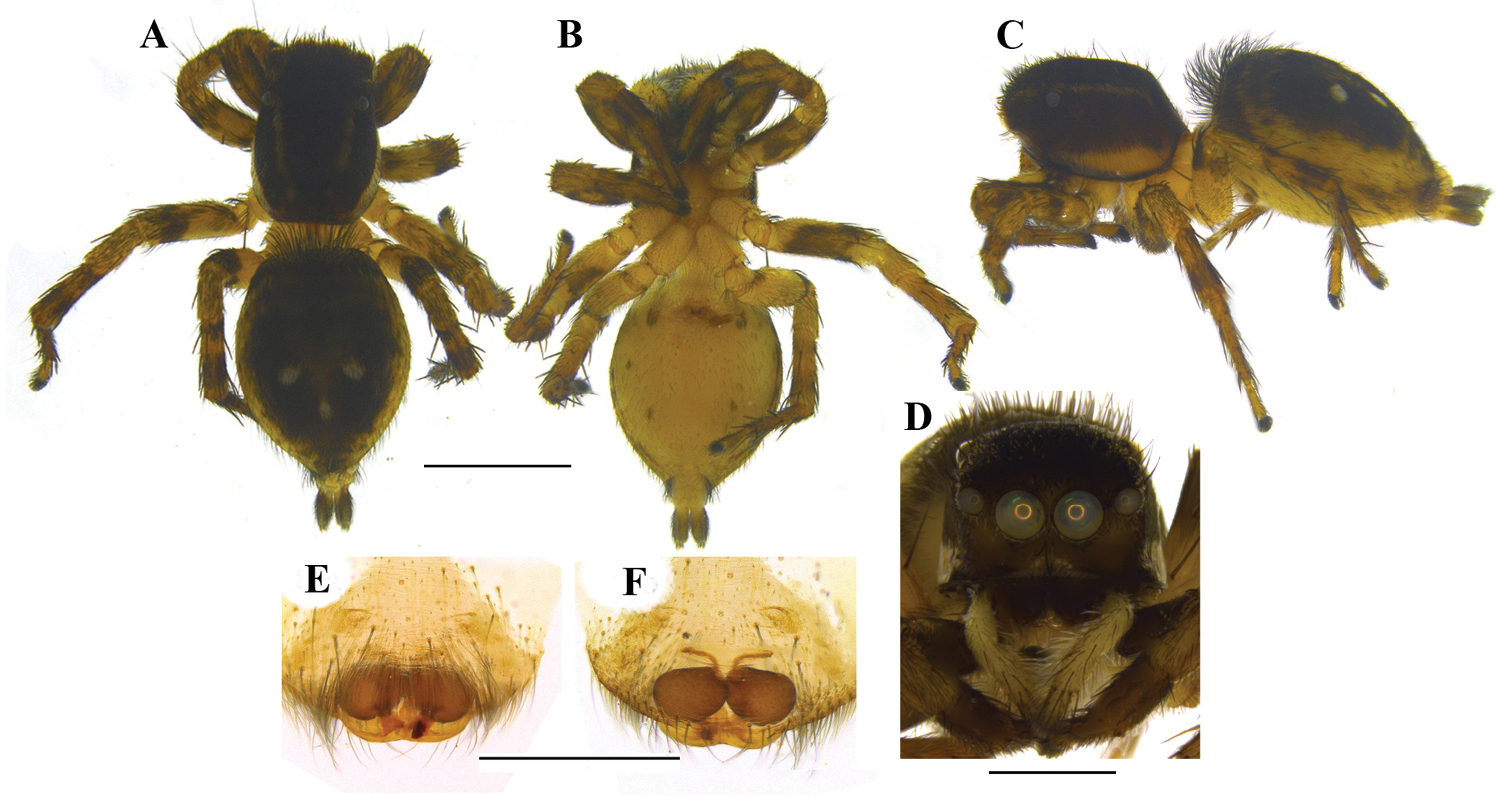
Female

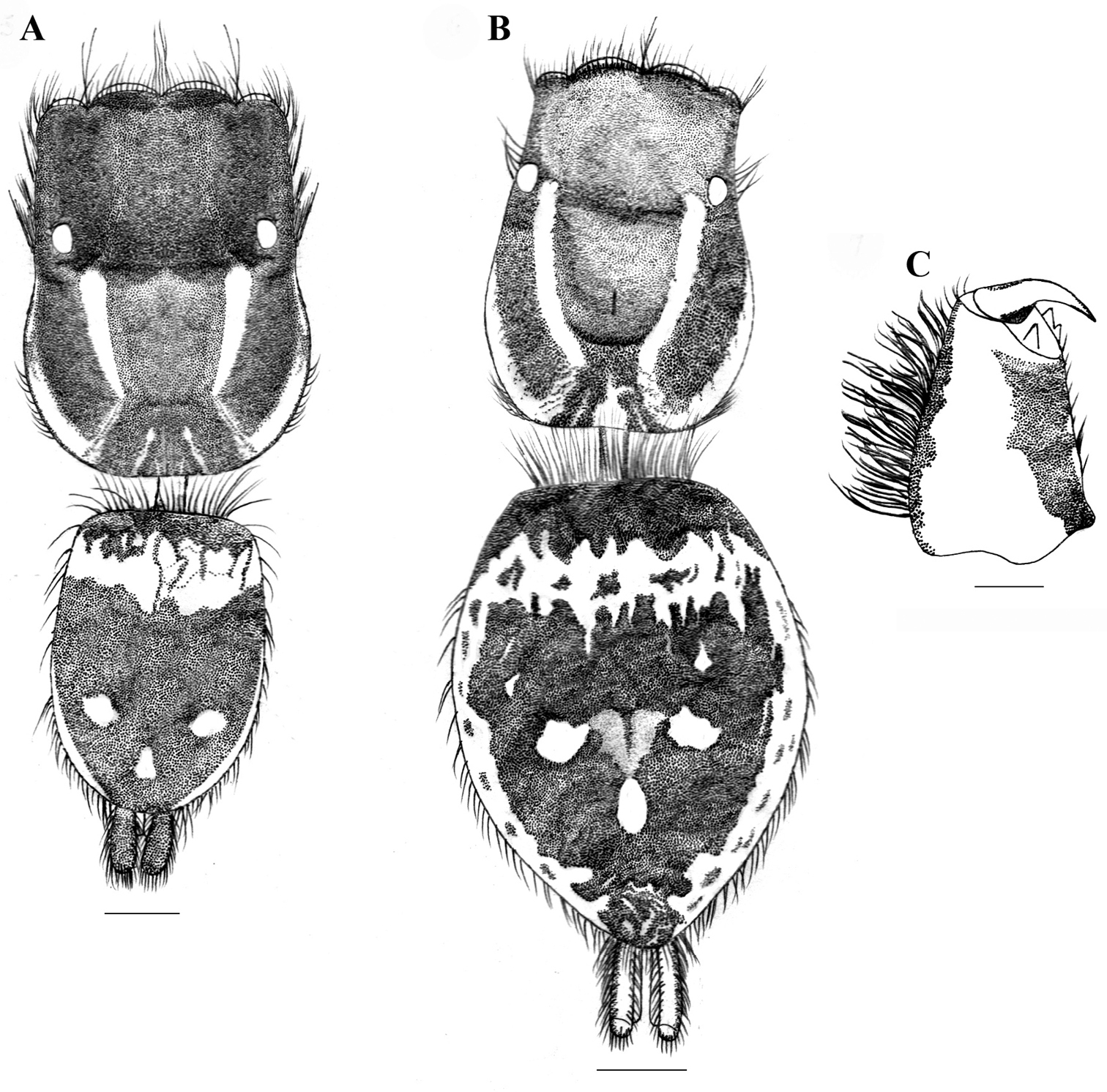
