= Dmitri V. Logunov =

Dmitri Viktorovich Logunov
- Born: May 25, 1962 (age 64); Volgograd, Russia
- Education: Saint Petersburg State University
- Known for: Systematics, taxonomy, and morphology of spiders
- Scientific career
- Fields: Arachnology
- Workplaces: Novosibirsk State University; Manchester Museum
- Author abbrev. (botany): Logunov

Dmitri Viktorovich Logunov (born 25 May 1962, Volgograd) is a Russian arachnologist.

== Biography ==
In 1979, he graduated from school in Batumi. In 1985, he graduated from the Faculty of Biology of Leningrad State University, defending a dissertation on spiders, which became his main field of study.

From 1996 to 2001, he was curator of the arachnid collection at the Zoological Museum of Novosibirsk. In 2001, he moved to Manchester, where he is curator of arthropods at the Manchester Museum of the University of Manchester. He is a member of numerous international associations in the fields of arachnology and entomology. He has authored more than 150 scientific publications, mainly on the systematics, taxonomy, and morphology of spiders, particularly the family Salticidae. He has described 296 spider species and two species of harvestmen, as well as 11 spider genera and three subgenera.

== Eponyms ==
Nineteen spider species, four beetle species, one harvestman, one fossil neuropteran, and one fossil bird species have been named in his honour.

- 1990:
  - Clubiona logunovi Mikhailov, 1990
- 1992:
  - Harpactea logunovi Dunin, 1992
- 1993:
  - Asthenargoides logunovi Eskov, 1993
- 1994:
  - Styloctetor logunovi (Eskov & Marusik, 1994)
- 1995:
  - Parasyrisca logunovi Ovtsharenko, Platnick & Marusik, 1995
- 1996:
  - Incestophantes logunovi Tanasevitch, 1996
  - Pellenes logunovi Marusik, Hippa & Koponen, 1996
- 2000:
  - Cebrennus logunovi Jäger, 2000
  - Mogrus logunovi Prószynski, 2000
  - Mughiphantes logunovi Tanasevitch, 2000
- 2001:
  - Micaria logunovi Zhang, Song & Zhu, 2001
- 2004:
  - Acantholycosa logunovi Marusik, Azarkina & Koponen, 2004
  - Aelurillus logunovi Azarkina, 2004
  - Oreoneta logunovi Saaristo & Marusik, 2004
  - Phlegra logunovi Azarkina, 2004
  - Xysticus logunovi Seyfulina & Mikhailov, 2004
- 2005:
  - Xysticus logunovi Ono & Martens, 2005
- 2011:
  - Pardosa logunovi Kronestedt & Marusik, 2011
  - Piratula logunovi Omelko, Marusik & Koponen, 2011
- 2023:
  - Kovalius logunovi Tchemeris, 2023

== Monographs ==
- Logunov, D.V., Marusik, Yu.M. (2000). Catalogue of the jumping spiders of northern Asia (Arachnida, Araneae, Salticidae). Moscow: KMK Sci. Press Ltd. 299 pp.
- Logunov, D.V., Marusik, Yu.M. (2003). A revision of the genus Yllenus Simon, 1868 (Arachnida, Araneae, Salticidae). Moscow: KMK Sci. Press Ltd. 167 pp.
- Marusik, Yu.M., Logunov, D.V., Koponen, S. (2000). Spiders of Tuva. South Siberia. Magadan: IBPN FEB RAS. 252 pp.
