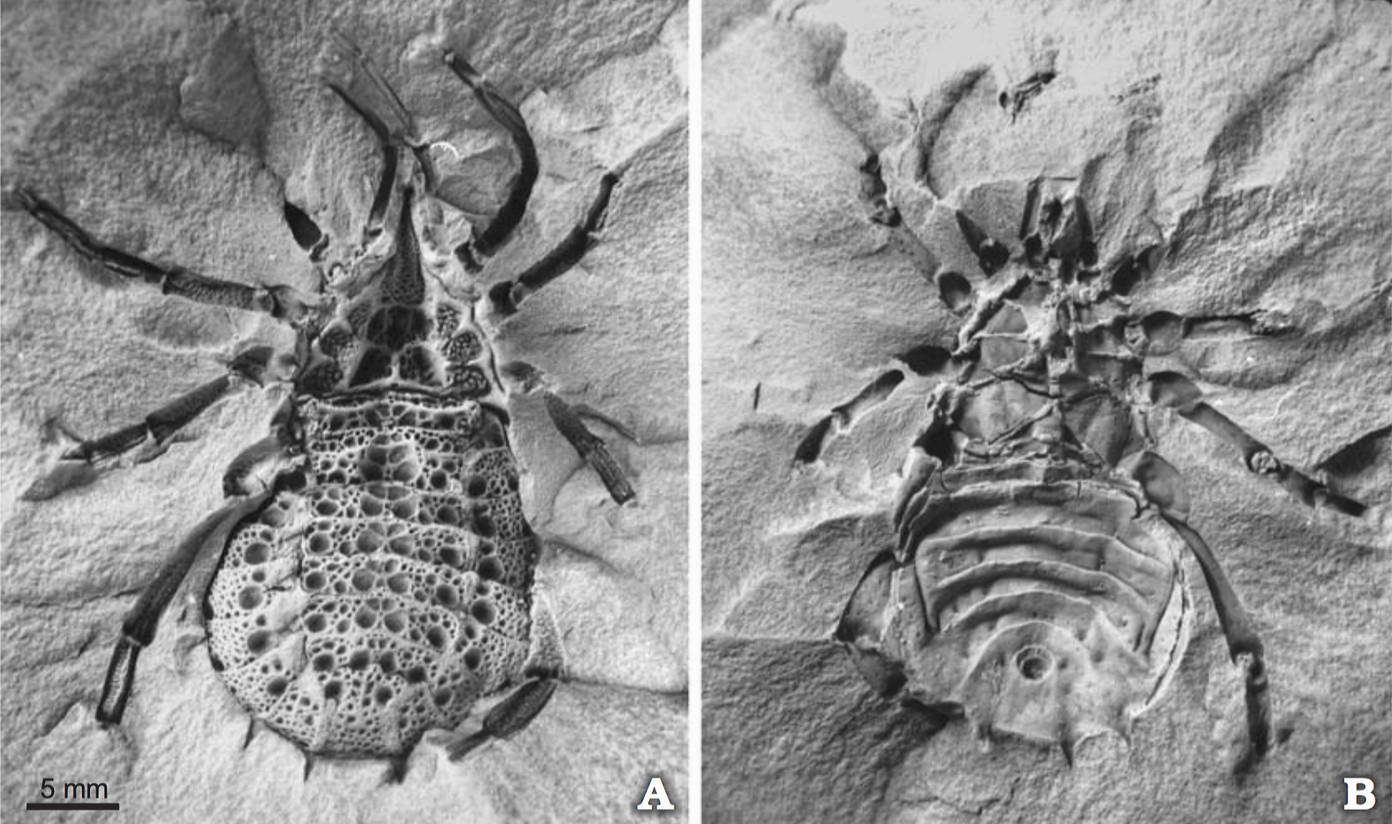
- Fossil of Eophrynus prestvicii (BU 699, Lapworth Museum, University of Birmingham, UK), whitened with ammonium chloride to improve contrast. A. Dorsal view. B. Ventral view.

Scientific classification
- Kingdom: Animalia
- Phylum: Arthropoda
- Subphylum: Chelicerata
- Class: Arachnida
- Order: †Trigonotarbida
- Family: †Eophrynidae
- Genus: †Eophrynus
- Species: †E. prestvicii

Binomial name
- †Eophrynus prestvicii (Buckland, 1837)

= Eophrynus prestvicii =

Eophrynus prestvicii Temporal range: 318.1–299 Ma Late Carboniferous (Gzhelian age)

Extinct species of arachnid

Eophrynus prestvicii is an extinct species of arachnid belonging to the order Trigonotarbida.

== Historical background ==
The first trigonotarbid was described in 1837 from the Coal Measures of Coalbrookdale in England by the famous English geologist Dean William Buckland. He believed it to be a fossil beetle and named it Curculoides prestvicii. A much better preserved example was later discovered from Coseley near Dudley; also in the English West Midlands conurbation. Described in 1871 by Henry Woodward, he correctly identified it as an arachnid and renamed it Eophrynus prestvicii – whereby the genus name comes from ἠώς (eos, meaning 'dawn'), and Phrynus, a genus of living whip spider (Amblypygi).

== Description ==
Eophrynus prestvicii can reach a length of about 2.5 centimetres (0.98 in). These arachnids were similar to modern spiders, but they could not produce silk. Recent x-ray imaging revealed that Eophrynus prestvicii were covered by protective spikes on the back-half of its body. This creature had long legs enabling it to run and hunt on the forest floor. Scientists at Imperial College London created a detailed 3D computer model of the arachnid from fossils.

== Distribution ==
This species is known from a handful of good quality fossils preserved inside siderite concretions. Fossils of this species have been found in the Carboniferous sediments of United Kingdom.
