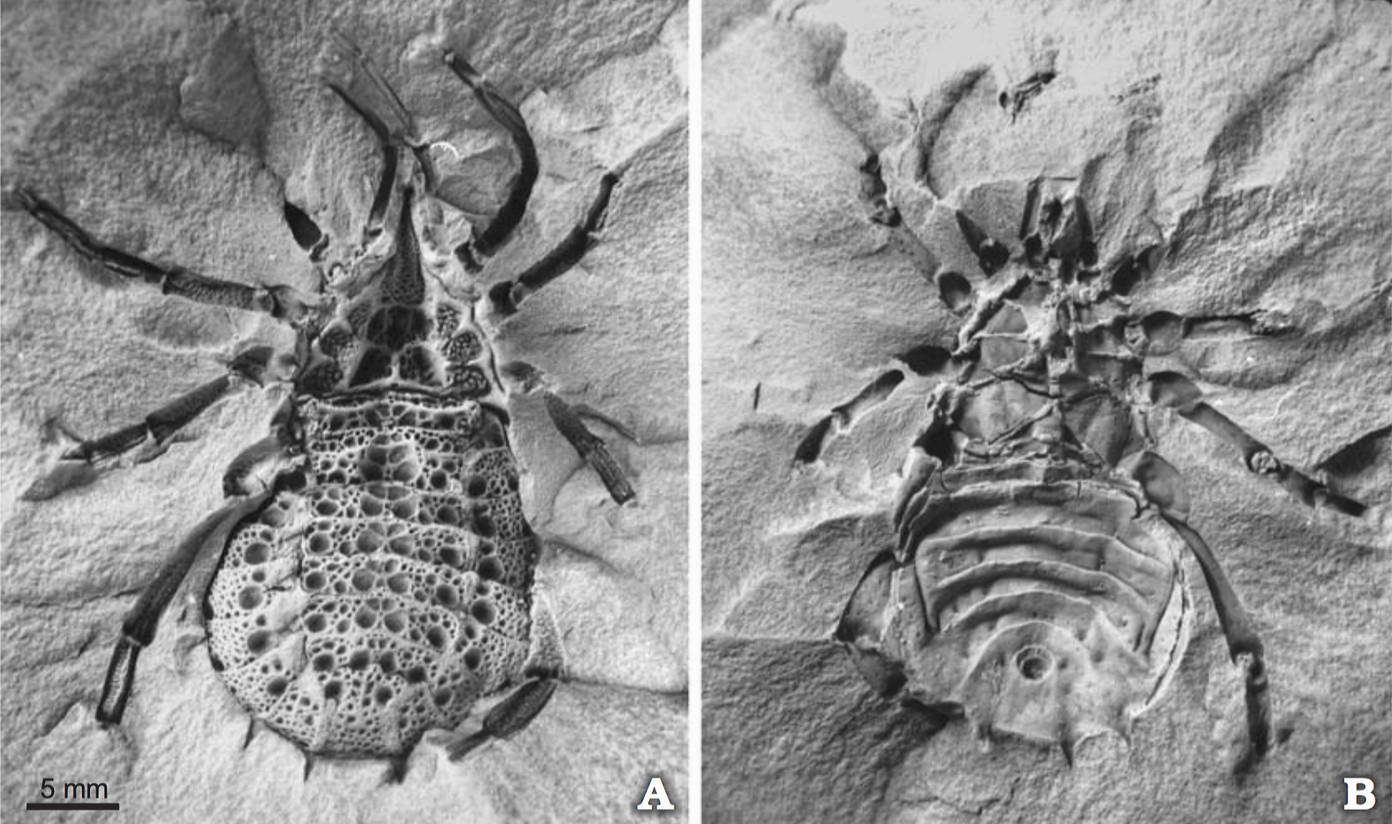
- Fossil of Eophrynus prestvicii (BU 699, Lapworth Museum, University of Birmingham, UK), whitened with ammonium chloride to improve contrast. A. Dorsal view. B. Ventral view.

Scientific classification
- Domain: Eukaryota
- Kingdom: Animalia
- Phylum: Arthropoda
- Subphylum: Chelicerata
- Class: Arachnida
- Order: †Trigonotarbida
- Family: †Eophrynidae
- Genus: †Eophrynus; Woodward, 1871

Species
- E. prestvicii Buckland, 1837; E. udus Brauckmann, Koch & Kemper, 1985

= Eophrynus =

Eophrynus Temporal range: Late Carboniferous, 318–299 Ma

Extinct genus of arachnids

Eophrynus is an extinct genus of arachnids from the extinct order Trigonotarbida, which lived during the Late Carboniferous period in Europe. The genus was first described in 1871 by Henry Woodward (geologist). The name comes from Eo, meaning 'dawn', and Phrynus, an extant genus of whip spider (order Amblypygi).

Two species have been recognised:

- Eophrynus prestvicii in England
- Eophrynus udus in Germany

Species of Eophrynus, as with other trigonotarbids, were similar to modern spiders but could not produce silk and the back-half of their body was made up of small plates.

The English species, E. prestvici, is known from a handful of good quality fossils preserved inside siderite concretions. Recent X-ray imaging revealed that these arachnids were covered by protective spikes.
