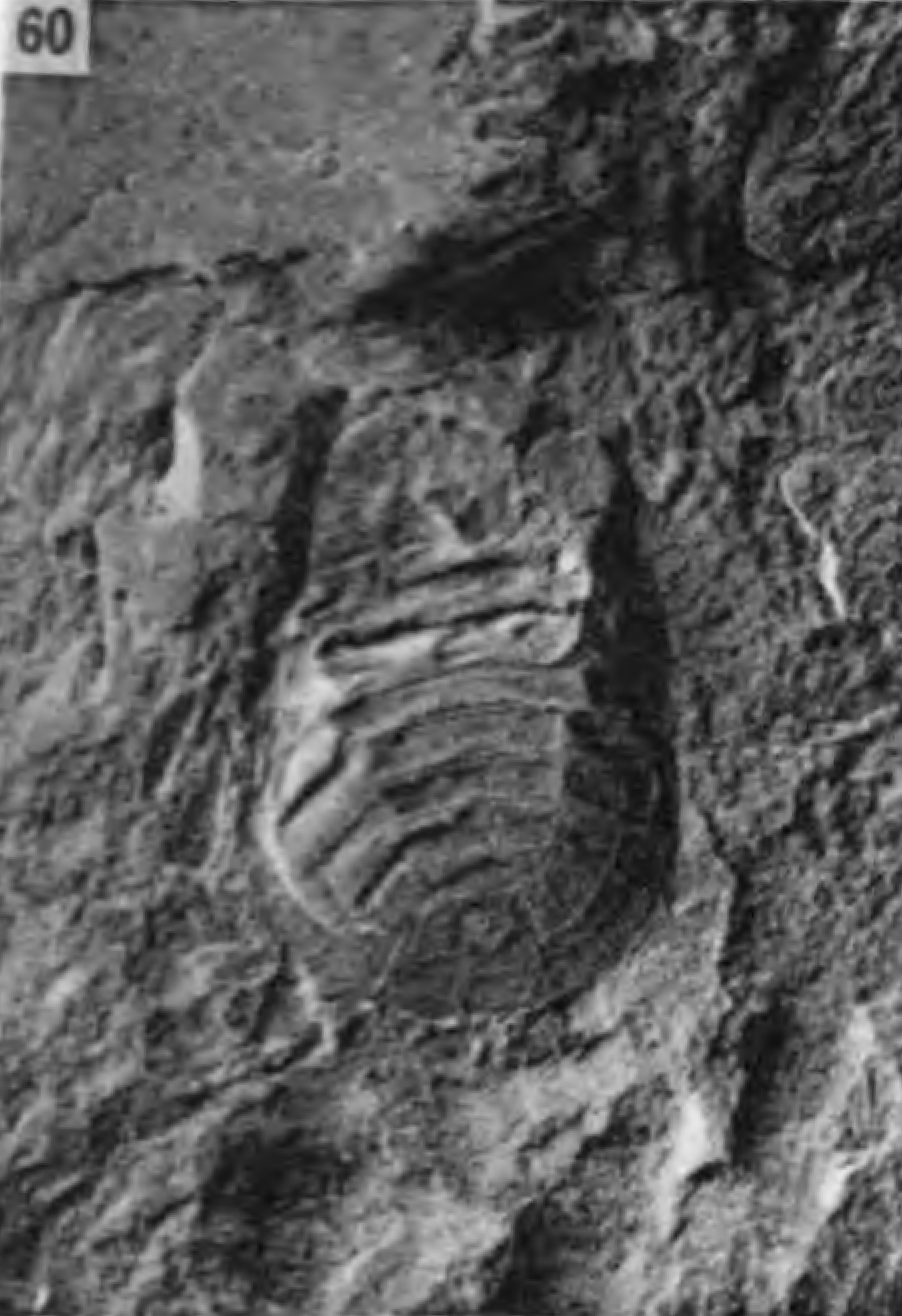
- Anthracomartus trilobitus

Scientific classification
- Domain: Eukaryota
- Kingdom: Animalia
- Phylum: Arthropoda
- Subphylum: Chelicerata
- Class: Arachnida
- Order: †Trigonotarbida
- Family: †Anthracomartidae
- Genus: †Anthracomartus; Karsch, 1882

Species
- Anthracomartus bohemica (Frič, 1901); Anthracomartus carcinoides (Frič, 1901); Anthracomartus elegans Frič, 1901; Anthracomartus granulatus Frič, 1904; Anthracomartus hindi Pocock, 1911; Anthracomartus janae (Opluštil, 1986); Anthracomartus kustae Petrunkevitch, 1953; Anthracomartus minor Kušta, 1884; Anthracomartus nyranensis (Petrunkevitch, 1953); Anthracomartus palatinus Ammon, 1901; Anthracomartus preisti Pocock, 1911; Anthracomartus radvanicensis (Opluštil, 1985); Anthracomartus triangularis Petrunkevitch, 1913; Anthracomartus trilobitus Scudder, 1884; Anthracomartus voelkelianus Karsch, 1882

= Anthracomartus =

Anthracomartus Temporal range: 314.6 Ma Westphalian

Extinct genus of arachnid

Anthracomartus is an extinct genus of Carboniferous-aged trigonotarbid arachnids. A fossil of the species Anthracomartus hindi (synonym: Cryptomartus hindi) was found to be 23 millimetres (0.91 in) long and 14 millimetres (0.55 in) wide.

== 3-D modeling ==
Scientists at Imperial College London created a detailed 3D computer model of A. hindi from fossils. 3D imaging revealed A. hindi has a flat body and large front limbs, indicating ambush hunting techniques similar to that of modern crab spiders due to the similarities in their anatomical features.
