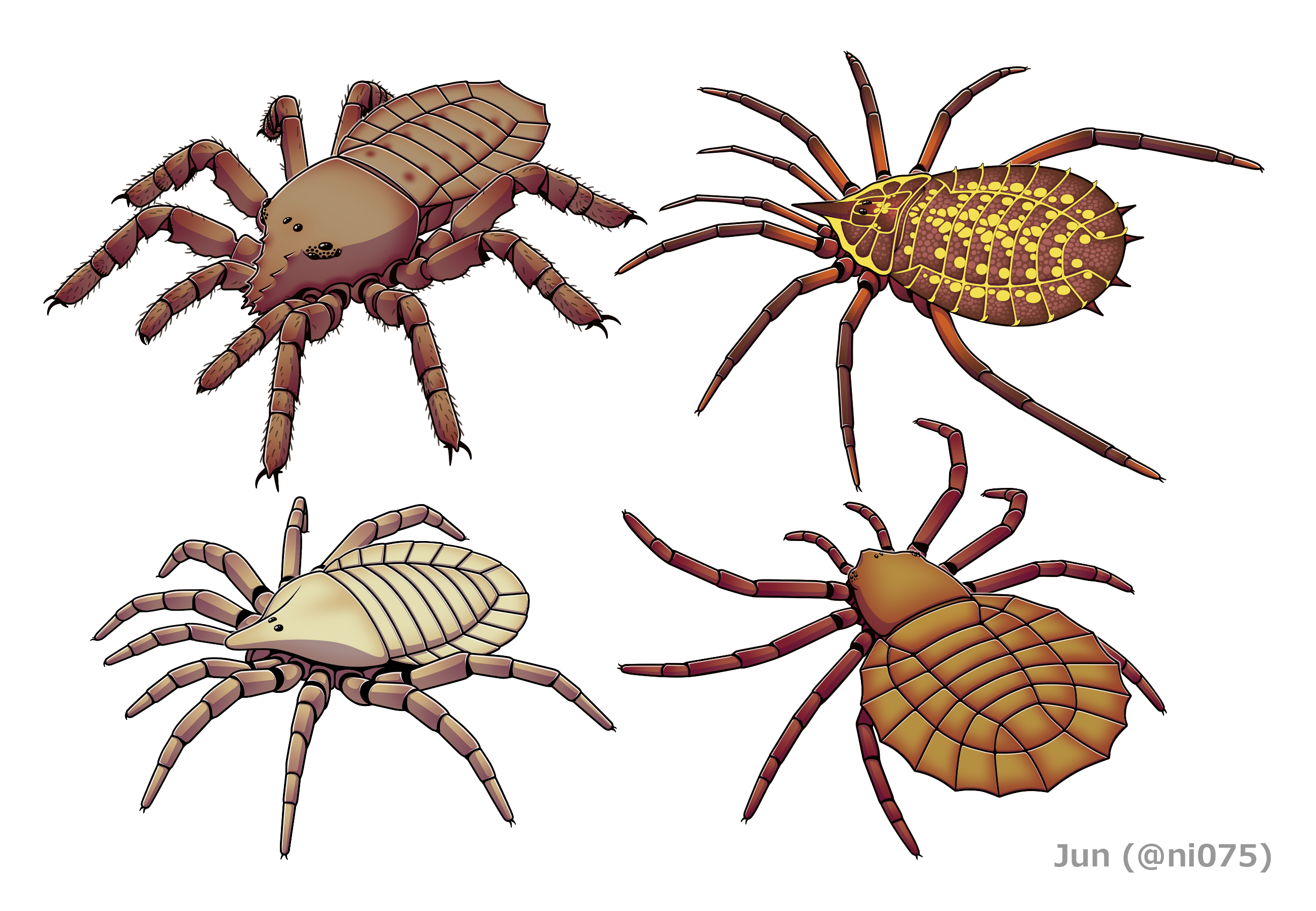
- Palaeocharinus rhyniensis, Eophrynus prestvicii, Trigonotarbus johnsoni and Maiocercus celticus

Scientific classification
- Kingdom: Animalia
- Phylum: Arthropoda
- Subphylum: Chelicerata
- Class: Arachnida
- Order: †Trigonotarbida; Petrunkevitch, 1949

Families
- Palaeocharinidae; Anthracomartidae; Anthracosironidae; Trigonotarbidae; Lissomartidae; Aphantomartidae; Kreischeriidae; Eophrynidae

Synonyms
- Anthracomarti Karsch, 1882; Meridogastra Thorell & Lindström, 1885; Eurymarti Matthew, 1895

= Trigonotarbida =

Trigonotarbida Temporal range: Pridoli–Sakmarian Late Silurian to Early Permian

Extinct order of arachnids

The order Trigonotarbida is a group of extinct arachnids whose fossil record extends from the late Silurian to the early Permian (Pridoli to Sakmarian). These animals are known from several localities in Europe and North America, as well as a single record from Argentina. Trigonotarbids can be envisaged as spider-like arachnids, but without silk-producing spinnerets. They ranged in size from a few millimetres to a few centimetres in body length and had segmented abdomens (opisthosoma), with the dorsal exoskeleton (tergites) across the backs of the animals' abdomens, which were characteristically divided into three or five separate plates. Probably living as predators on other arthropods, some later trigonotarbid species were quite heavily armoured and protected themselves with spines and tubercles. About seventy species are currently known, with most fossils originating from the Carboniferous coal measures.

== Historical background ==
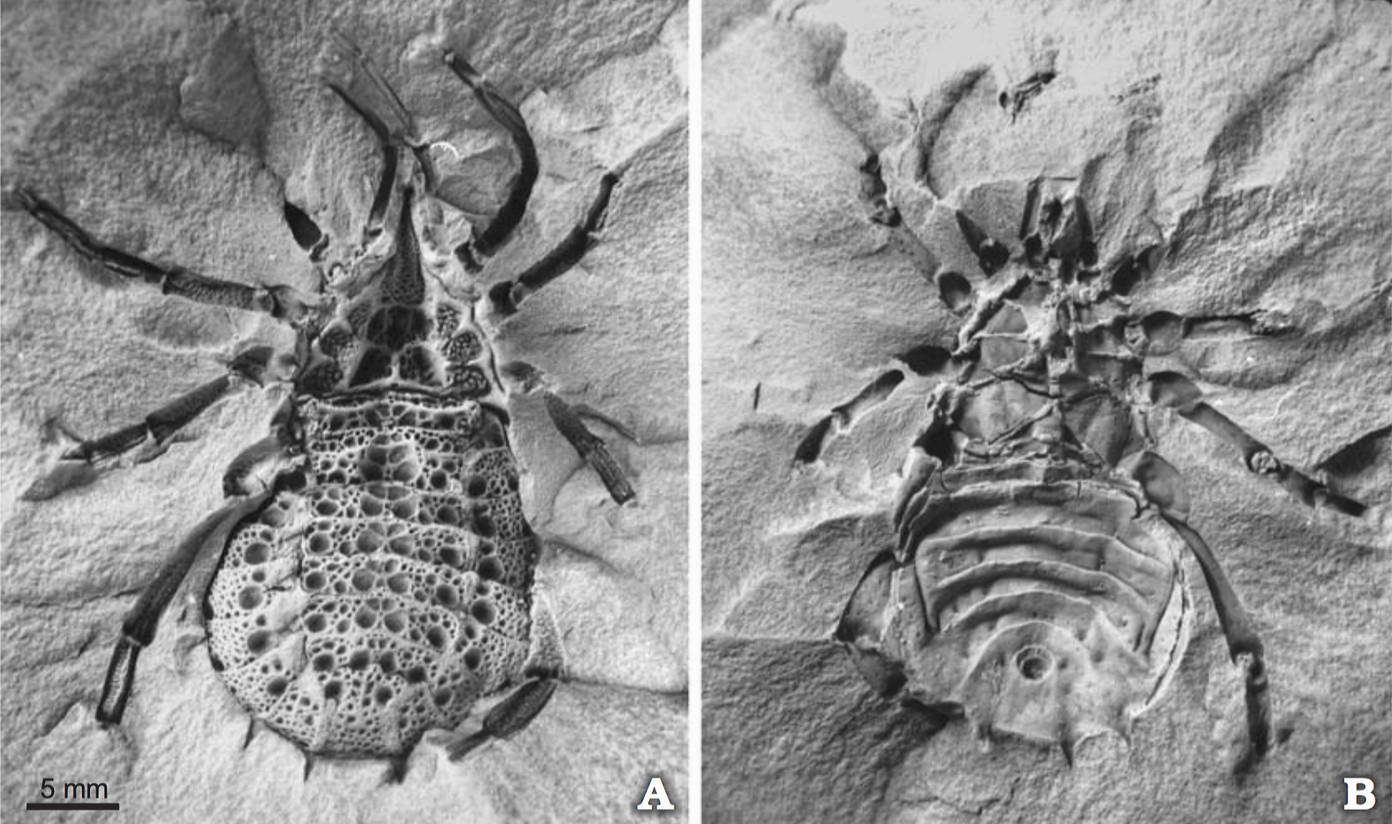
Fossils of Eophrynus prestvicii

The first trigonotarbid was described in 1837 from the coal measures of Coalbrookdale in England by the famous English geologist Dean William Buckland. He believed it to be a fossil beetle and named it Curculoides prestvicii. A much better preserved example was later discovered from Coseley near Dudley; also in the English West Midlands conurbation. Described in 1871 by Henry Woodward, he correctly identified it as an arachnid and renamed it Eophrynus prestvicii—whereby the genus name comes from ἠώς (eos, meaning 'dawn'), and Phrynus, a genus of living whip spider (Amblypygi). Woodward subsequently described another trigonotarbid, Brachypyge carbonis, from the coal measures of Mons in Belgium; although this fossil is known only from its abdomen and was initially mistaken for those of a crab.

=== A new arachnid order ===
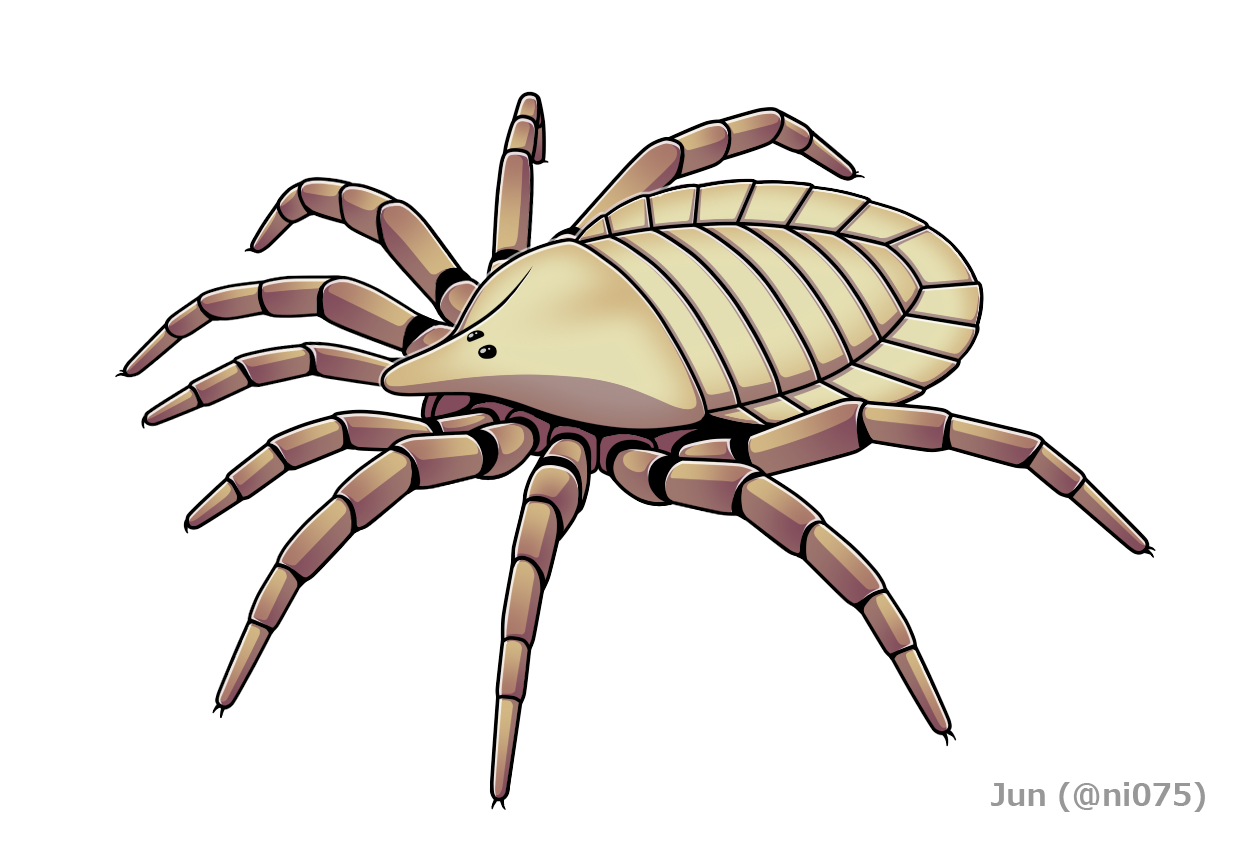
Reconstruction of Trigonotarbus johnsoni, the eponymous species of Trigonotarbida.

In 1882, the German zoologist Ferdinand Karsch described a number of fossil arachnids from the coal measures of Neurode in Silesia (now Poland), including one he named Anthracomartus voelkelianus in honour of Herr Völkel, the foreman of the mine where it was discovered. This species was raised to a new, extinct, arachnid order which Karsch called Anthracomarti. The name is derived from ἄνθραξ (anthrax), the Greek word for coal. A number of other fossils which would eventually be placed in Trigonotarbida were discovered around this time. Hanns Bruno Geinitz described Kreischeria wiedei from the coal measures of Zwickau in Germany, although he interpreted it as a fossil pseudoscorpion. Johann Kušta described Anthracomartus krejcii from Rakovník in the Czech Republic, and published further descriptions in a number of subsequent papers. In 1884, Samuel Hubbard Scudder described Anthracomartus trilobitus from Fayetteville, Arkansas—the first trigonotarbid from North America.

== Relationships ==
- Pantetrapulmonata
  - - †Trigonotarbita
    - ？
      Ricinulei
  - Tetrapulmonata
    - Araneae
    - - †Haptopoda
      - - Amblypygi
        - - Uropygi (Thelyphonida)
          - Schizomida

Internal phylogeny of Pantetrapulmonata, showing position of Trigonotarbita and possible relationship with Ricinulei. Extinct taxa indicated by '†'.

Early studies tended to confuse trigonotarbids with other living or extinct groups of arachnids; particularly harvestmen (Opiliones). Petrunkevitch's division of the trigonotarbids into two, unrelated, orders was noted above. In detail, he divided the arachnids into suborders based on the width of the division between the two parts of the body (the prosoma and opisthosoma). Anthracomartida and another extinct order, Haptopoda, were grouped into a subclass Stethostomata defined by a broad division of the body and downward-hanging mouthparts. Trigonotarbida was placed in its own subclass Soluta and defined as having a division of the body which was variable in width. Petrunkevitch's scheme was largely followed in subsequent studies of fossil arachnids.

=== Pantetrapulmonata ===
In the 1980s, Bill Shear and colleagues carried out an important study on well preserved Mid Devonian trigonotarbids from Gilboa, New York. They questioned whether it was appropriate to define a group of animals on a variable character state and carried out the first cladistic analysis of fossil and living arachnids. They showed that trigonotarbids are closely related to a group of arachnids which have gone under various names (Caulogastra, Arachnidea, etc.), but for which the name Tetrapulmonata has become most widespread. Members of the Tetrapulmonata include spiders (Araneae), whip spiders (Amblypygi), whip scorpions (Uropygi) and shorttailed whipscorpion (Schizomida) and, together with trigonotarbids, share characters like two pairs of book lungs and similar mouthparts with fangs operating rather like a pocket knife. In a 2007 study of arachnid relationships, the Shear et al. hypothesis was largely supported and a group Pantetrapulmonata was proposed which comprises Trigonotarbida + Tetrapulmonata. This has since been corroborated in more recent cladistic analyses.

=== Trigonotarbids and ricinuleids ===
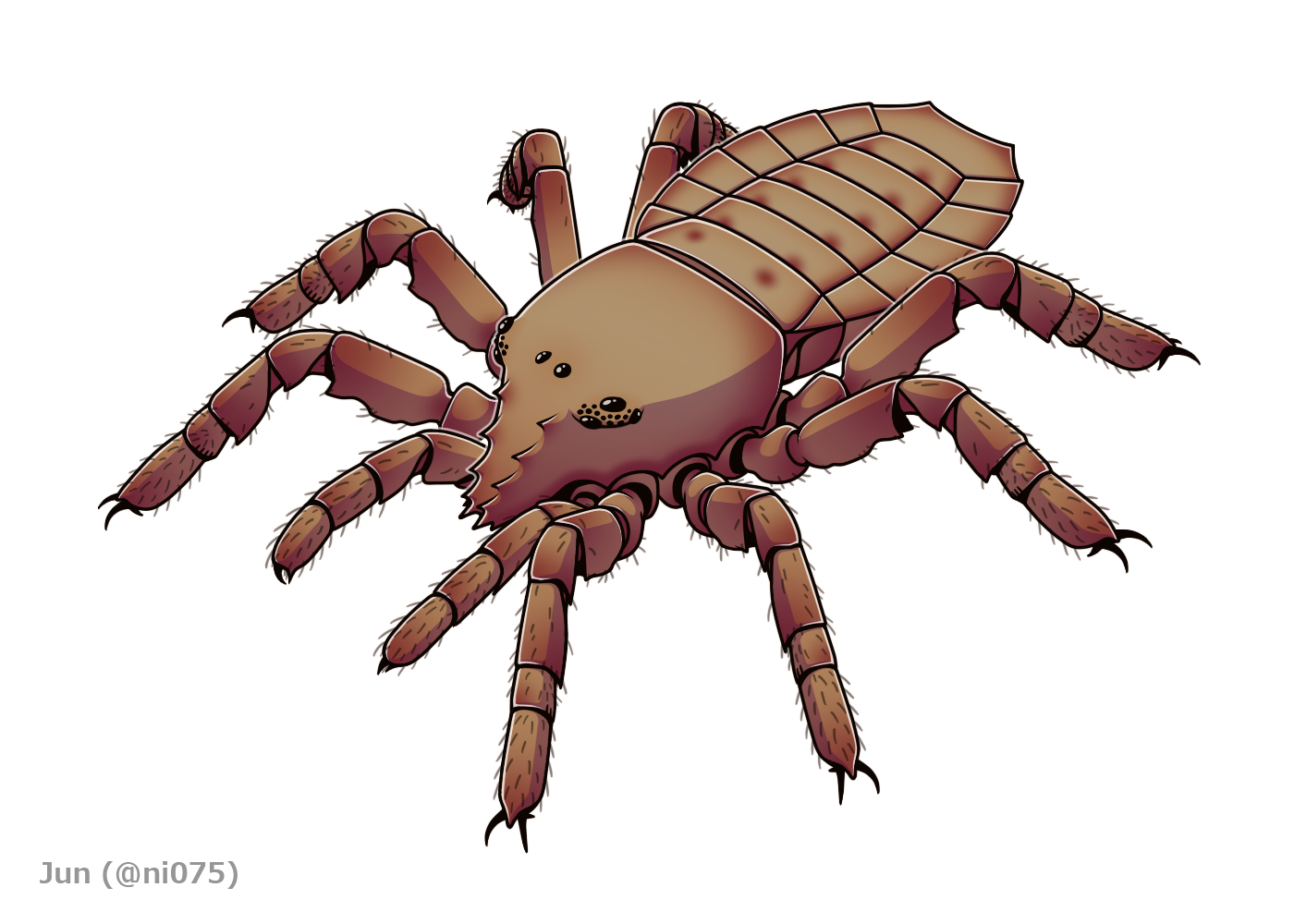
Reconstruction of Palaeocharinus, a genus known to have tiny pedipalpal claws.

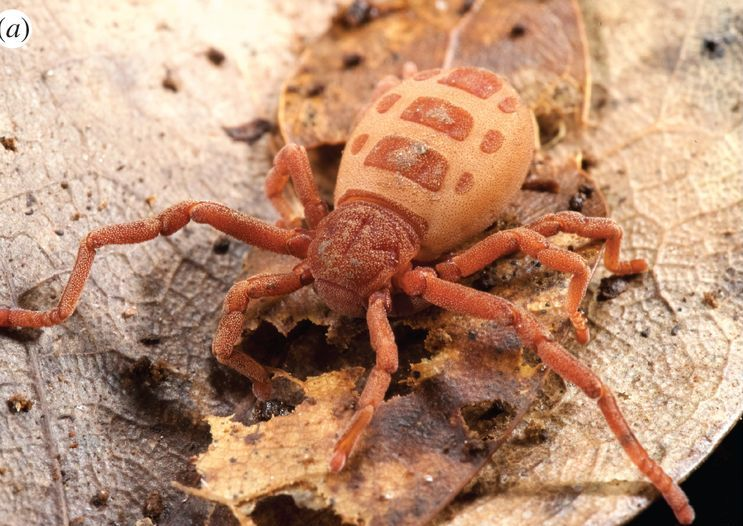
The ricinuleid species Ricinoides atewa, showing divided tergites.

In 1892, Ferdinand Karsch suggested that the rare and rather bizarre-looking ricinuleids (Ricinulei) were the last living descendants of the trigonotarbids. A similar hypothesis was reintroduced by Dunlop, who pointed out distinct similarities and possible sister group relationship between these arachnid groups. Both have opisthosomal tergites divided into median and lateral plates and both have a complicated coupling mechanism between the prosoma and the opisthosoma which 'locks' the two halves of the body together. Although cladistic analysis has tended to recover ricinuleids in their traditional position closely related to mites and ticks, further discoveries have revealed that the tip of the pedipalp ends in a small claw in both trigonotarbids and ricinuleids. If the hypothesis is true, ricinuleids, despite the lack of tetrapulmonate key characters (e.g. book lungs), may represent part of the pantetrapulmonate clade alongside trigonotarbids as well.

=== Internal relationships ===
The first cladistic analysis of the trigonotarbids was published in 2014. This recovered the families Anthracomartidae, Anthracosironidae, and Eophrynidae as monophyletic. In contrast Trigonotarbidae, Aphantomartidae, Palaeocharinidae, and Kreischeriidae were not. Two clades were consistently recovered with strong support—(Palaeocharinus (Archaeomartidae + Anthracomartidae)), and Lissomartus as sister group the 'eophrynid assemblage' (Aphantomartus (Alkenia (Pseudokreischeria (Kreischeria (Eophrynus + Pleophrynus)))).

== Description ==
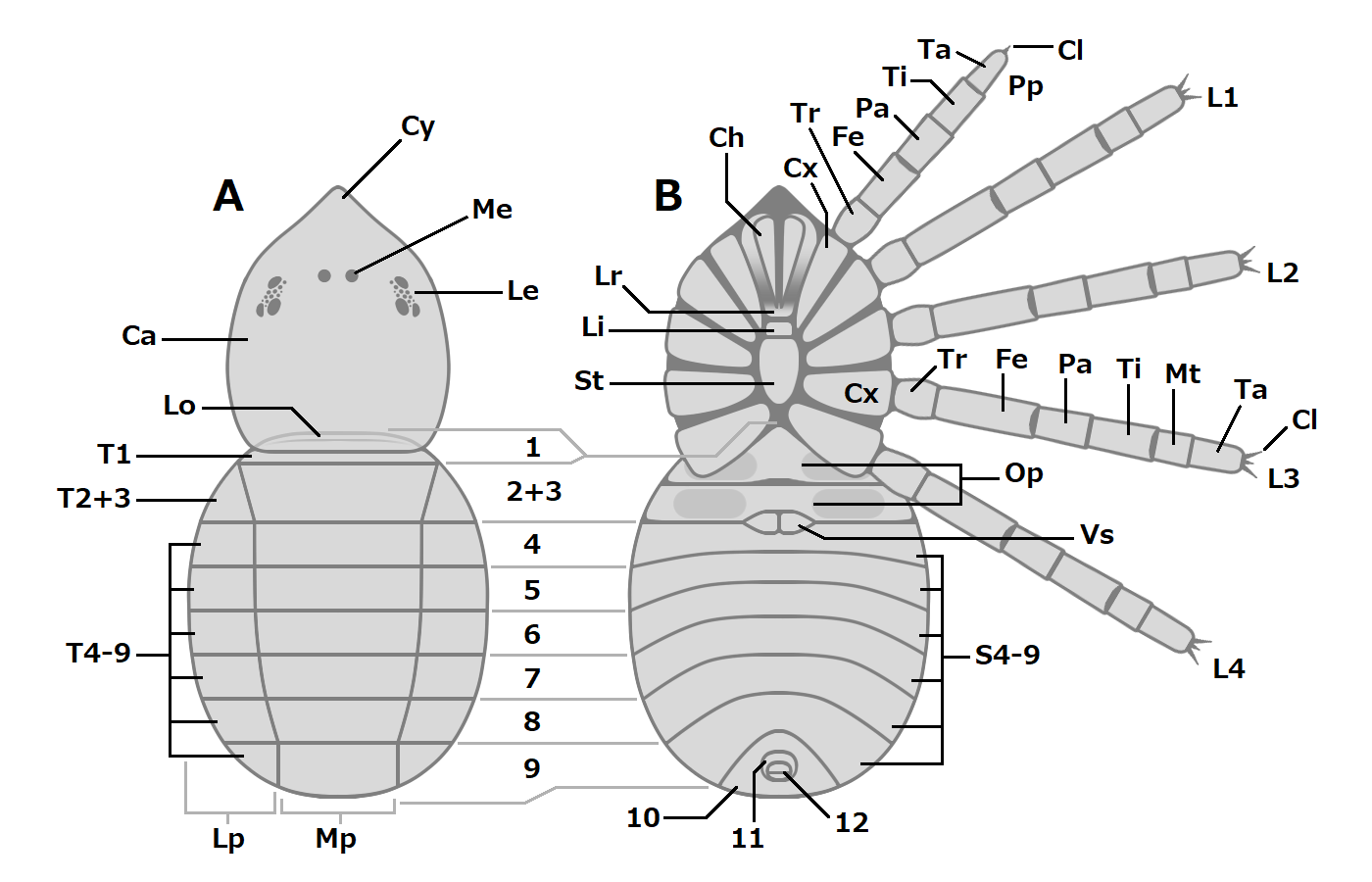
Dorsal (A) and ventral (B) morphology of a trigonotarbid.

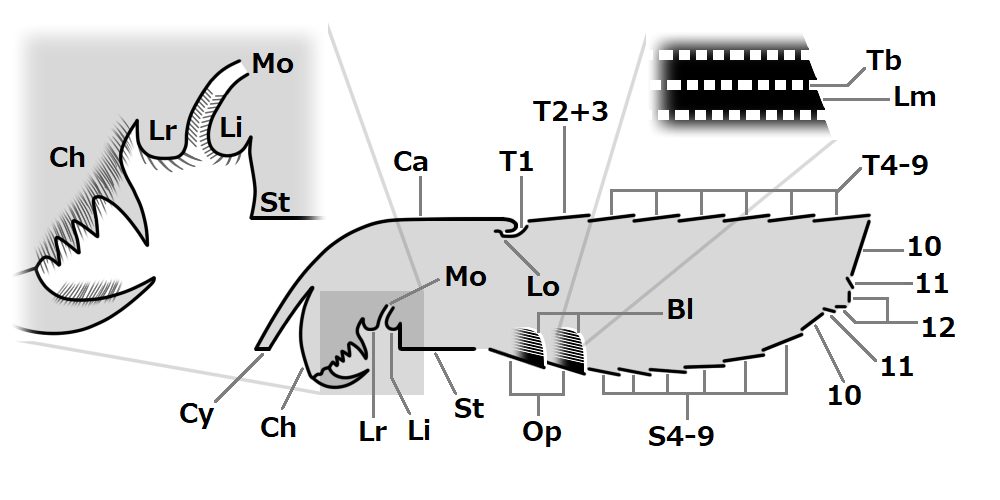
External morphology of a trigonotarbid in sagittal section.

Trigonotarbids superficially resemble spiders, but can be easily recognised by having tergites on the dorsal side of the opisthosoma divided into median and lateral plates. This character is shared with ricinuleids (Ricinulei) (see also Ricinulei#Relationships). As in other arachnids, the body is divided into a prosoma (or cephalothorax) and opisthosoma (or abdomen). Body length ranges from a couple of millimetres up to about 5 cm (2.0 in) in Kreischeria.

=== Prosoma ===
The prosoma is covered by the carapace and always bears a pair of median eyes. In the probably basal families Palaeocharinidae, Anthracomartidae – and perhaps also Anthracosironidae – there is an additional pair of lateral eye tubercles which, at least in palaeocharinids, appear to have borne a series of individual lenses. In this sense palaeocharinids seem to be in the process of reducing a compound eye. Anterior margin of the carapace protrude into a projection referred to as clypeus.

The chelicerae are of the "pocket-knife" type consisting of a basal segment and a sharp, curving fang. The chelicerae are described as paleognathic: the fangs are held parallel to one another, like those of mesothele and mygalomorph spiders, but the chelicerae hang downwards like those of araneomorph spiders. There is no evidence in well-preserved fossils for the opening of a venom gland, thus trigonotarbids were probably not venomous. The chelicerae may have been slightly retractable into the prosoma. Well-preserved palaeocharinids show evidence for a small, slit-like mouth with an upper lip (a labrum or rostrum) and a lower lip (or labium). Inside the mouth there is some sort of filtering system formed from hairs or platelets which strongly suggests that trigonotarbids (like spiders and many other arachnids) could eat only preorally digested, liquified prey.

The pedipalps have the typical arachnid structure with a coxa, trochanter, femur, patella, tibia and tarsus. They are pediform, i.e. they look like small legs and were not highly modified. There is no evidence for a special sperm transfer device as in the modified palpal organ of male spiders. In at least the palaeocharinids and anthracomartids the tip of the pedipalp is modified into a small chela (claw) formed from the tarsal claw (or apotele) and a projection from the tarsus. As mentioned above, a very similar arrangement is seen at the end of the pedipalp in Ricinulei.

The walking legs again follow the typical arachnid plan with a coxa, trochanter, femur, patella, tibia, metatarsus and tarsus. The coxae surround a single sternum. In well preserved palaeocharinids there is a ring, or annulus, around the trochanter–femur joint which may be the remains of an earlier leg segment. The legs are largely unmodified, although in Anthracosironidae the forelegs are quite large and spiny, presumably to help catch prey. The legs end in three claws, two large ones and a smaller median claw.

=== Opisthosoma ===
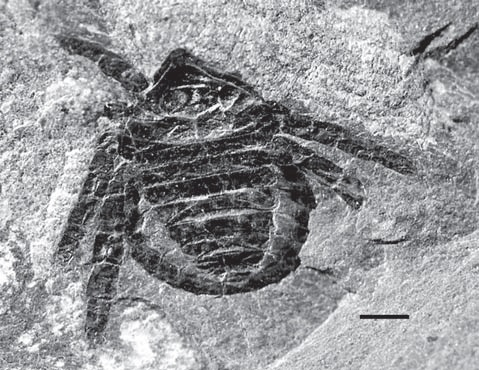
Fossil of Namurotarbus roessleri, showing divided tergites.

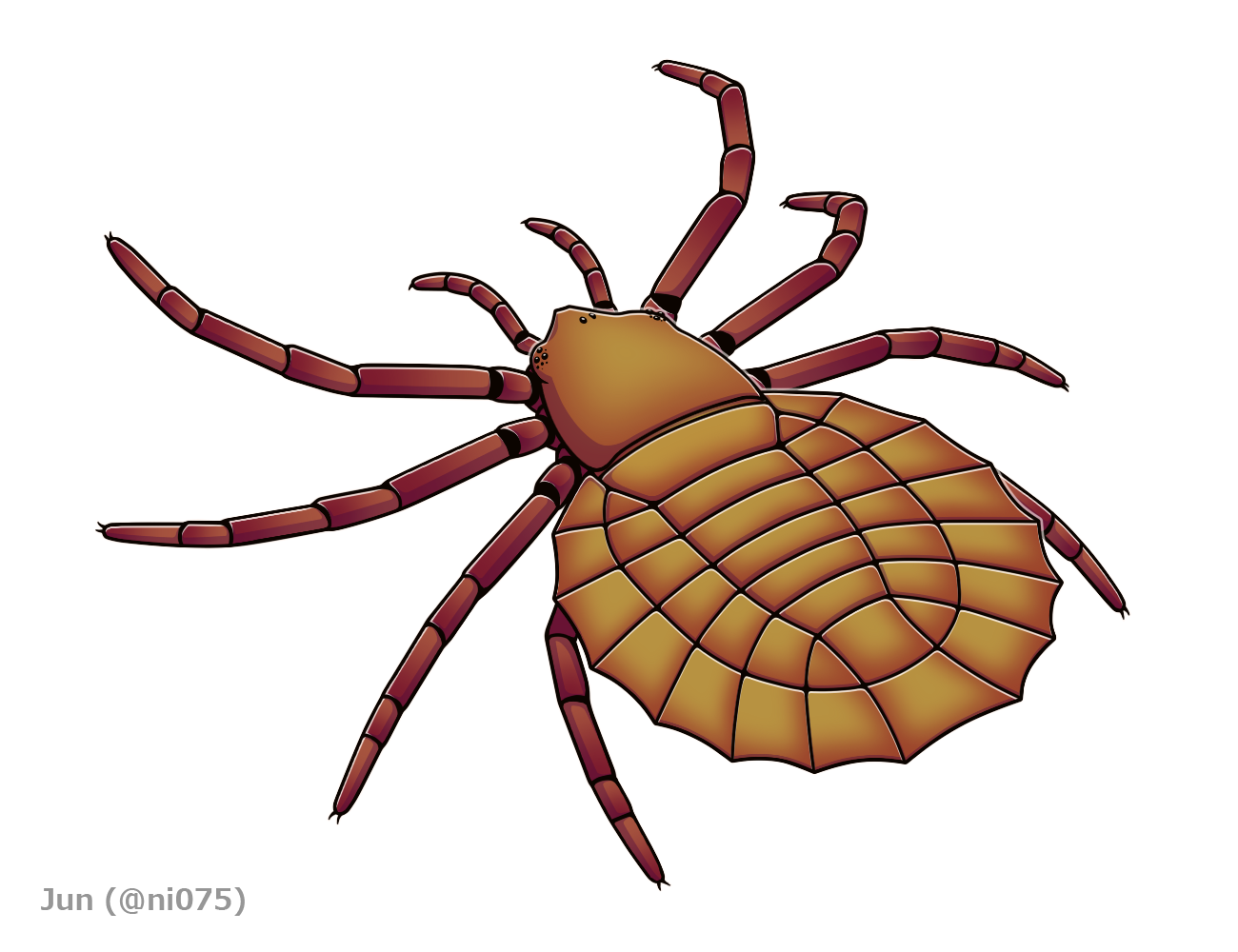
Reconstruction of an anthracomartid trigonotarbid Maiocercus celticus, showing five rows of dorsal plates.

The opisthosoma is largely suboval in outline with a flatten dorsal surface. It compose of 12 segments, with some of them had undergone degrees of fusion or reduction, hence the previous misinterpretation of around 8 to 11 segments. Tergite of the first segment partially covered by the posterior margin of preceding carapace, forming a complicated coupling mechanism known as 'locking ridge'. Tergites of segment 2 to 8 (segment 9 in some species) were all laterally divided into three plates (one median and two lateral), with those of segment 2 and 3 fused to each other in most species. However, the corresponding tergites of the family Anthracomartidae are further subdivided into 5 plates. The last three segments are usually only visible from the ventral side, with the two final segments constricted into a tiny ring-like section known as pygidium.

Ventral side of opisthosomal segment 2 to 9 covered by series of lung-bearing opercula (2 and 3) and curved sternites (4 to 9). The first segment apparently lacking any ventral plates. Just like other lung-bearing arachnids (scorpion and tetrapulmonate), the book lungs of trigonotarbids formed by layers of trabecula-bearing lamellae, which is a feature adapted to a terrestrial, air-breathing lifestyle. A pair of ventral sacs located between the posterior operculum and following sternite had been observed in some species.

== Paleobiology ==
In July 2014 scientists used computer-based techniques to re-create a possible walking gait for the animal. A subsequent review article suggested by comparison with mites, with presumably similar lifestyle and environment, a metachronal rather than alternating leg coordination was more likely. Subsequent work by the researchers behind the initial publication used simulation approaches to assess the efficiency of a range of gaits using an updated trigonotarbid model.

== Included taxa ==
As of 2020, 70 valid species had been included under Trigonotarbida as follows:

plesion taxa

- Palaeotarbus Dunlop, 1999
  - Palaeotarbus jerami (Dunlop, 1996) – Late Silurian, England

Palaeocharinidae Hirst, 1923

- Aculeatarbus Shear, Selden & Rolfe, 1987
  - Aculeatarbus depressus Shear, Selden & Rolfe, 1987 – Mid Devonian, United States
- Gelasinotarbus Shear, Selden & Rolfe, 1987
  - Gelasinotarbus bifidus Shear, Selden & Rolfe, 1987 – Mid Devonian, United States
  - Gelasinotarbus bonamoae Shear, Selden & Rolfe, 1987 – Mid Devonian, United States
  - Gelasinotarbus heptops Shear, Selden & Rolfe, 1987 – Mid Devonian, United States
  - Gelasinotarbus reticulatus Shear, Selden & Rolfe, 1987 – Mid Devonian, United States
- Gigantocharinus Shear, 2000
  - Gigantocharinus szatmaryi Shear, 2000 – Late Devonian, United States
- Gilboarachne Shear, Selden & Rolfe, 1987
  - Gilboarachne griersoni Shear, Selden & Rolfe, 1987 – Mid Devonian, United States
- Palaeocharinus Hirst, 1923
  - Palaeocharinus calmani Hirst, 1923 – Early Devonian, Scotland
  - Palaeocharinus hornei Hirst, 1923 – Early Devonian, Scotland
  - Palaeocharinus kidstoni Hirst, 1923 – Early Devonian, Scotland
  - Palaeocharinus rhyniensis Hirst, 1923 – Early Devonian, Scotland
  - Palaeocharinus scourfieldi Hirst, 1923 – Early Devonian, Scotland
  - Palaeocharinus tuberculatus Fayers, Dunlop & Trewin, 2005 – Early Devonian, Scotland
- Spinocharinus Poschmann & Dunlop, 2011
  - Spinocharinus steinmeyeri Poschman & Dunlop, 2011 - Devonian, Bürdenbach

Archaeomartidae Haase, 1890

- Archaeomartus Størmer, 1970
  - Archaeomartus levis Størmer, 1970 - Devonian, Alken an der Mosel

Anthracomartidae Haase, 1890

- synonyms
  - = Promygalidae Frič, 1904
  - = Brachypygidae Pocock, 1911
  - = Coryphomartidae Petrunkevitch, 1945
  - = Pleomartidae Petrunkevitch, 1945
- Anthracomartus Karsch, 1882
  - synonyms
    - = Brachylycosa Frič, 1904
    - = Cleptomartus Petrunkevitch, 1949
    - = Coryphomartus Petrunkevitch, 1945
    - = Cryptomartus Petrunkevitch, 1945
    - = Oomartus Petrunkevitch, 1953
    - = Perneria Frič, 1904
    - = Pleomartus Petrunkevitch, 1945
    - = Promygale Frič, 1901
  - Anthracomartus bohemica (Frič, 1901) – Late Carboniferous, Czech Republic
  - Anthracomartus carcinoides (Frič, 1901) – Late Carboniferous, Czech Republic
    - synonyms
      - = Promygale rotunda Frič, 1901
      - = Perneria salticoides Frič, 1904
  - Anthracomartus elegans Frič, 1901 – Late Carboniferous, Czech Republic
  - Anthracomartus hindi Pocock, 1911 – Late Carboniferous, England
    - synonyms
      - = Cleptomartus hangardi Guthörl, 1965
      - = Cryptomartus meyeri Guthörl, 1964
      - = Cleptomartus planus Petrunkevitch, 1949
      - = Cryptomartus rebskei Brauckmann, 1984
  - Anthracomartus granulatus Frič, 1904 – Late Carboniferous, Poland
  - Anthracomartus janae (Opluštil, 1986) – Late Carboniferous, Czech Republic
  - Anthracomartus kustae Petrunkevitch, 1953 – Late Carboniferous, Czech Republic
  - Anthracomartus minor Kušta, 1884 – Late Carboniferous, Czech Republic
    - synonym
      - = Anthracomartus socius Kušta, 1888
  - Anthracomartus nyranensis (Petrunkevitch, 1953) – Late Carboniferous, Czech Republic
  - Anthracomartus palatinus Ammon, 1901 – Late Carboniferous, Germany
  - Anthracomartus priesti Pocock, 1911 – Late Carboniferous, England
    - synonyms
      - = Anthracomartus denuiti Pruvost, 1922
      - = Cleptomartus plautus Petrunkevitch, 1949
  - Anthracomartus radvanicensis (Opluštil, 1985) – Late Carboniferous, Czech Republic
  - Anthracomartus triangularis Petrunkevitch, 1913 – Late Carboniferous, Canada
  - Anthracomartus trilobitus Scudder, 1884 – Late Carboniferous, United States
  - Anthracomartus voelkelianus Karsch, 1882 – Late Carboniferous, Poland
- Brachypyge Woodward, 1878
  - Brachypyge carbonis Woodward, 1878 – Late Carboniferous, Belgium
- Maiocercus Pocock, 1911
  - Maiocercus celticus (Pocock, 1902) – Late Carboniferous, Europe
    - synonym
      - = Maiocercus orbicularis Gill, 1911

Anthracosironidae Pocock, 1903

- Anthracosiro Pocock, 1903
  - Anthracosiro fritschii Pocock, 1903 – Late Carboniferous, Europe
    - synonym
      - = Anthracosiro elongatus Waterlot, 1934
  - Anthracosiro woodwardi Pocock, 1903 – Late Carboniferous, Europe
    - synonyms
      - = Anthracosiro corsini Pruvost, 1926
      - = Anthracosiro latipes Gill, 1909
- Arianrhoda Dunlop & Selden, 2004
  - Arianrhoda bennetti Dunlop & Selden, 2004 – Early Devonian, Wales
- Vratislavia Frič, 1904
  - Vratislavia silesica (Roemer, 1878) - Carboniferous, Silesia

Trigonotarbidae Petrunkevitch, 1949

- Trigonotarbus Pocock, 1911
  - Trigonotarbus arnoldi Petrunkevitch, 1955 – Late Carboniferous, France
  - Trigonotarbus johnsoni Pocock, 1911 – Late Carboniferous, England
  - Trigonotarbus stoermeri Schultka, 1991 – Early Devonian, Germany

Lissomartidae Dunlop, 1995

- Lissomartus Petrunkevitch, 1949
  - Lissomartus carbonarius (Petrunkevitch, 1913) – Late Carboniferous, United States
  - Lissomartus schucherti (Petrunkevitch, 1913) – Late Carboniferous, United States

Aphantomartidae Petrunkevitch, 1945

- synonym
  - = Trigonomartidae Petrunkevitch, 1949
- Alkenia Størmer, 1970
  - Alkenia mirabilis Størmer, 1970 - Devonian, Alken an der Mosel
- Aphantomartus Pocock, 1911
  - synonyms
    - = Trigonomartus Petrunkevitch, 1913
    - = Phrynomartus Petrunkevitch, 1945a
  - Aphantomartus areolatus Pocock, 1911 – Early/Late Carboniferous, Europe
    - synonyms
      - = Aphantomartus pococki Pruvost, 1912
      - = Trigonomartus dorlodoti Pruvost, 1930
      - = Eophrynus waechteri Guthörl, 1938
      - = ?Trigonomartus pruvosti van der Heide, 1951
      - = ?Brachylycosa manebachensis Müller, 1957
  - Aphantomartus ilfeldicus (Scharf, 1924) – Permian, Germany
  - Aphantomartus pustulatus (Scudder, 1884) – Late Carboniferous, Europe, North America
    - synonyms
      - = ?Kreischeria villeti Pruvost, 1912
      - = Cleptomartus plötzensis Simon, 1971

Kreischeriidae Haase, 1890

- Anzinia Petrunkevitch, 1953
  - Anzinia thevenini (Pruvost, 1919) – Late Carboniferous, France
- Gondwanarache Pinto & Hünicken, 1980
  - Gondwanarache argentinensis Pinto & Hünicken, 1980 – Late Carboniferous, Argentina
- Hemikreischeria Frič, 1904
  - Hemikreischeria geinitzi (Thevenin, 1902) – Late Carboniferous, France
- Kreischeria Geinitz, 1882
  - Kreischeria wiedei Geinitz, 1882 – Late Carboniferous, Germany
- Pseudokreischeria Petrunkevitch, 1953
  - Pseudokreischeria pococki (Gill, 1924) – Late Carboniferous, England
    - synonym
      - = Eophrynus varius Petrunkevitch, 1949

Eophrynidae Karsch, 1882

- synonym
  - = Hemiphrynidae Frič, 1904
- Eophrynus Woodward, 1871
  - Eophrynus prestvicii (Buckland, 1837) – Late Carboniferous, England
  - Eophrynus udus Brauckmann, Koch & Kemper, 1985 – Late Carboniferous, Germany
- Nyranytarbus Harvey & Selden, 1995
  - synonym
    - Hemiphrynus Frič, 1901
  - Nyranytarbus hofmanni (Frič, 1901) – Late Carboniferous, Czech Republic
  - Nyranytarbus longipes (Frič, 1901) – Late Carboniferous, Czech Republic
- Petrovicia Frič, 1904
  - Petrovicia proditoria Frič, 1904 – Late Carboniferous, Czech Republic
- Planomartus Petrunkevitch, 1953
  - Planomartus krejcii (Kušta, 1883) – Late Carboniferous, Czech Republic
    - synonym
      - = Anthracomartus affinis Kušta, 1885
- Pleophrynus Petrunkevitch, 1945a
  - Pleophrynus verrucosus (Pocock, 1911) – Late Carboniferous, UK, United States
    - synonym
      - = Eophrynus warei Dix & Pringle, 1930
      - = Pleophrynus ensifer Petrunkevitch, 1945a
      - = Eophrynus jugatus Ambrose & Romano, 1972
- Pocononia Petrunkevitch, 1953
  - Pocononia whitei (Ewing, 1930) – Early Carboniferous, United States
- Somaspidion Jux, 1982
  - Somaspidion hammapheron Jux, 1982
- Stenotrogulus Frič, 1904
  - synonyms
    - = Cyclotrogulus Frič, 1904
    - = Pseudoeophrynus Příbyl, 1958
  - Stenotrogulus salmii (Stur, 1877) – Late Carboniferous, Czech Republic
    - synonyms
      - = Cyclotrogulus sturii Frič, 1904 [non Hasse, 1890]
      - = Pseudoeophrynus ostraviensis Příbyl, 1958

Family uncertain

- Aenigmatarbus Poschmann, Dunlop, Bértoux & Galtier, 2016
  - Aenigmatarbus rastelli Poschmann, Dunlop, Bértoux & Galtier, 2016 - Carboniferous, Graissessac, France
- Namurotarbus Poschmann & Dunlop, 2010
  - Namurotarbus roessleri (Dunlop & Brauckmann, 2006) - Carboniferous, Hagen-Vorhalle
    - synonyms
      - = Archaeomartus roessleri Dunlop & Brauckmann, 2006
- Permotarbus Dunlop & Rößler, 2013
  - Permotarbus schuberti Dunlop & Rößler, 2013 Permian, Chemnitz
- Tynecotarbus Hradská & Dunlop, 2013
  - Tynecotarbus tichaveki Hradská & Dunlop, 2013 - Carboniferous, Týnec

incertae sedis

- Anthracophrynus Andrée, 1913
  - Anthracophrynus tuberculatus Andrée, 1913 – Late Carboniferous, Germany
- Areomartus Petrunkevitch, 1913
  - Areomartus ovatus Petrunkevitch, 1913 - Carboniferous, West Virginia
- 'Eophrynus' scharfi Scharf, 1924 – Early Permian, Germany
- Aphantomartus Pocock, 1911
  - Aphantomartus woodruffi (Scudder, 1893) - Carboniferous, Rhode Island

nomina dubia

- Anthracomartus buchi (Goldenberg, 1873) – Late Carboniferous, Germany
- Anthracomartus hageni (Goldenberg, 1873) – Late Carboniferous, Germany
- Elaverimartus pococki Petrunkevitch, 1953 – Late Carboniferous, Scotland
- Eurymartus latus Matthew, 1895 – Late Carboniferous, Canada
- ?Eurymartus spinulosus Matthew, 1895 – Late Carboniferous, Canada
