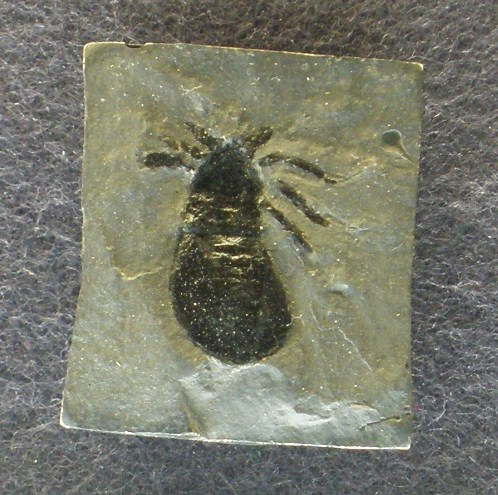

Scientific classification
- Kingdom: Animalia
- Phylum: Arthropoda
- Subphylum: Chelicerata
- Class: Arachnida
- Order: †Trigonotarbida
- Family: †Anthracomartidae; Haase, 1890

Genera
- See text.

Synonyms
- Promygalidae Frič, 1904; Brachypygidae Pocock, 1911; Coryphomartidae Petrunkevitch, 1945; Pleomartidae Petrunkevitch, 1945

= Anthracomartidae =

Extinct family of spiders

Anthracomartidae, first described by Haase, 1890, is a family of the extinct arachnid order Trigonotarbida. It is likely to be most closely related to the Archaeomartidae, based on a 2014 cladistic analysis, within the clade (Palaeocharinus (Archaeomartidae + Anthracomartidae)). Many specimens come from siderite nodules of late Carboniferous age in Europe and North America.

== Genera ==
Anthracomartidae contains the genera:

- Anthracomartus Karsch, 1882
- Brachypyge Woodward, 1878
- Maiocercus Pocock, 1911

The genus also was previously considered to contain other genera before they were later synonymized with Anthracomartus and various species within. These include:

- Brachylycosa Frič, 1904
- Cleptomartus Petrunkevitch, 1949
- Coryphomartus Petrunkevitch, 1945
- Cryptomartus Petrunkevitch, 1945
- Oomartus Petrunkevitch, 1953
- Pleomartus Petrunkevitch, 1945
- Promygale Frič, 1904
