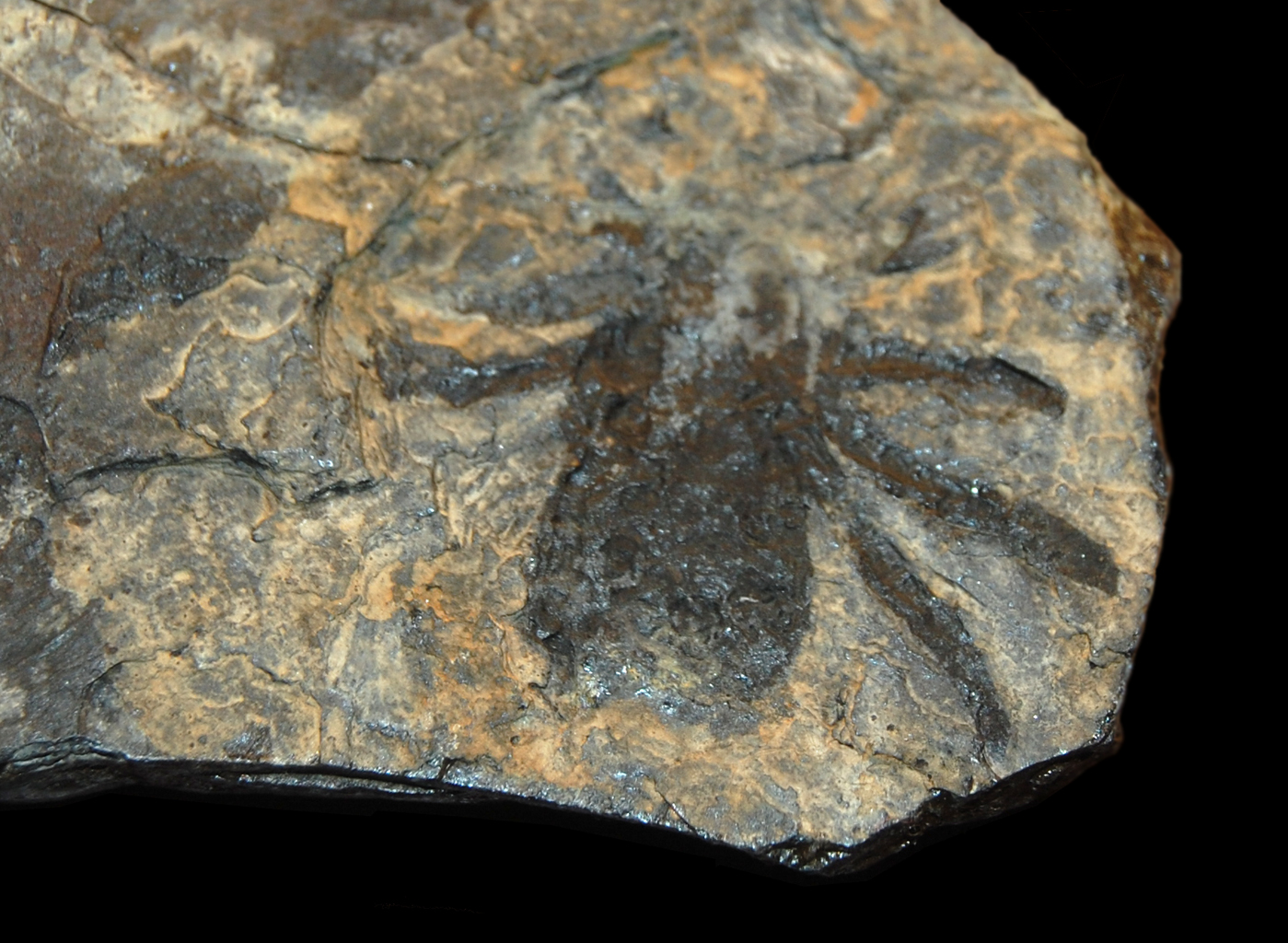
- Kreischeria specimen at Vienna

Scientific classification
- Domain: Eukaryota
- Kingdom: Animalia
- Phylum: Arthropoda
- Subphylum: Chelicerata
- Class: Arachnida
- Order: †Trigonotarbida
- Family: †Kreischeriidae
- Genus: †Kreischeria; Geinitz, 1882

Type species
- Kreischeria wiedei Geinitz, 1882

= Kreischeria =

Kreischeria Temporal range: Late Carboniferous, 332.9–298.9 Ma

Extinct genus of arachnids

Kreischeria is a genus of extinct trigonotarbid arachnids known from the Carboniferous of Germany.

In a redescription of the genus, Kreischeria wiedei was recognised by Rößler and Dunlop as by far largest of all trigontarbids, measuring around 51 millimetres (2.0 in) in length.

== History ==
Kreischeria was first described by Geinitz in 1882, where it was erroneously identified as a Pseudoscorpion. Haase later identified the genus correctly as a trigontarbid, but under the original name Anthracomarti. Fairly recently, the holotype was rediscovered after being lost for many years, and in 1997 the genus was described in detail.
