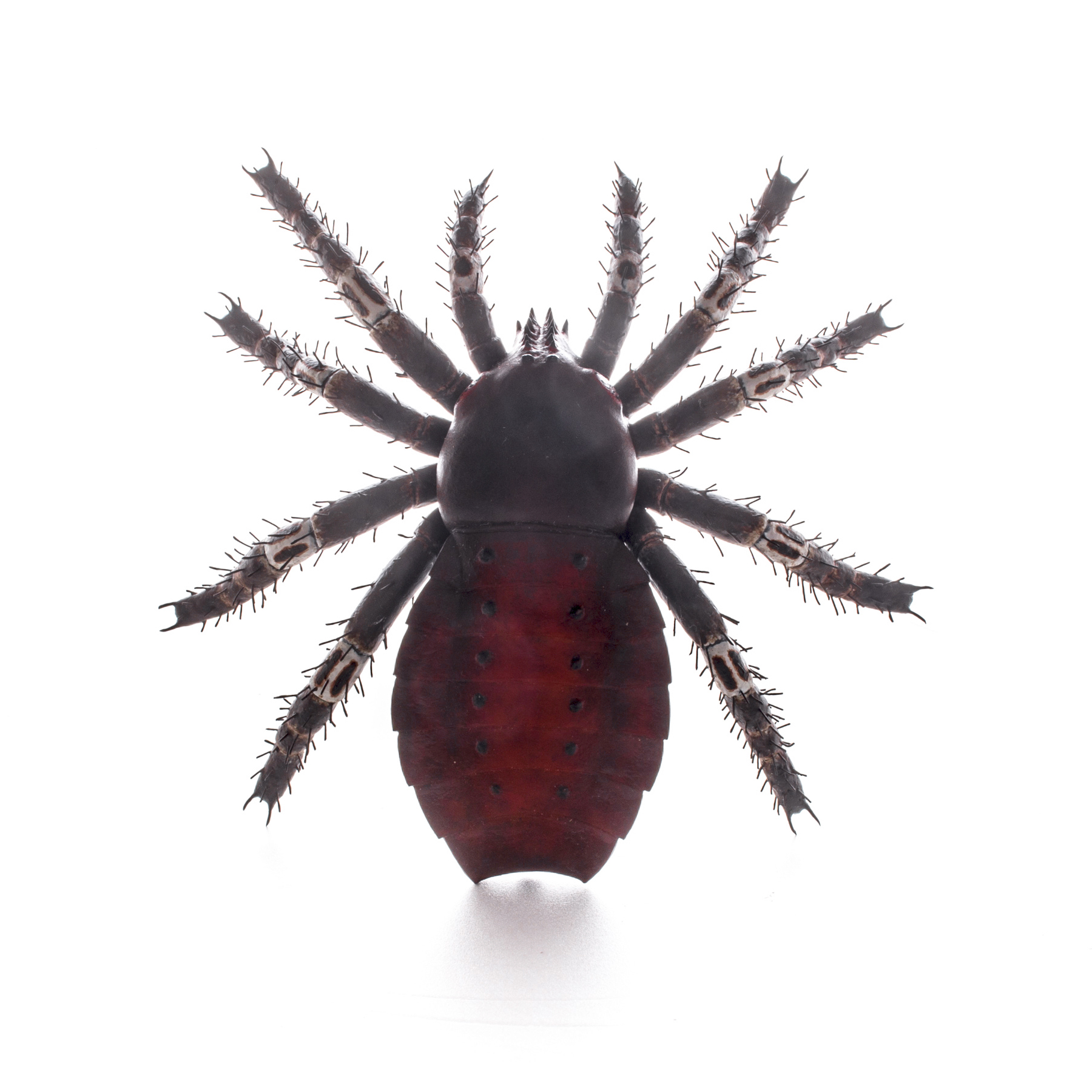
- Palaeocharinus rhyniensis life restoration at MUSE - Science Museum in Trento

Scientific classification
- Kingdom: Animalia
- Phylum: Arthropoda
- Subphylum: Chelicerata
- Class: Arachnida
- Order: †Trigonotarbida
- Family: †Palaeocharinidae
- Genus: †Palaeocharinus; Hirst, 1923

Type species
- Palaeocharinus rhyniensis Hirst, 1923

= Palaeocharinus =

Palaeocharinus Temporal range: 410 Ma

Extinct genus of spiders

Palaeocharinus is an extinct genus of extinct trigonotarbid arachnids known from the Devonian of western Europe. The genus was first found and described in the Rhynie chert in the 1920s by Arthur Stanley Hirst and S. Maulik. The family to which the genus belongs may be paraphyletic.

== Species ==
- Palaeocharinus calmani (Hirst, 1923) – Early Devonian, Scotland
- Palaeocharinus hornei (Hirst, 1923) – Early Devonian, Scotland
- Palaeocharinus kidstoni (Hirst, 1923) – Early Devonian, Scotland
- Palaeocharinus rhyniensis (Hirst, 1923) – Early Devonian, Scotland
- Palaeocharinus scourfieldi (Hirst, 1923) – Early Devonian, Scotland
- Palaeocharinus tuberculatus (Fayers, Dunlop & Trewin, 2005) – Early Devonian, Scotland
