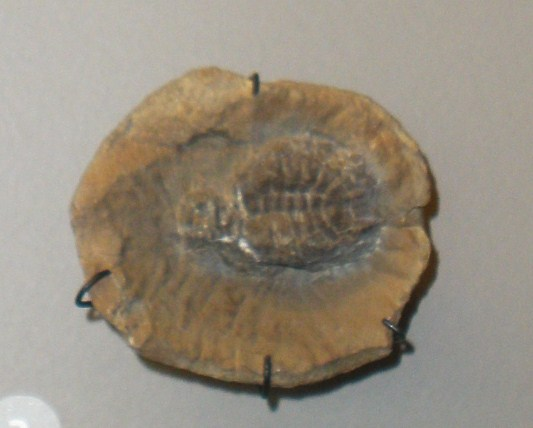
- Fossil of Maiocercus celticus located in Musee d'Histoire Naturelle, Brussels, Belgium.

Scientific classification
- Domain: Eukaryota
- Kingdom: Animalia
- Phylum: Arthropoda
- Subphylum: Chelicerata
- Class: Arachnida
- Order: †Trigonotarbida
- Family: †Anthracomartidae
- Genus: †Maiocercus; Pocock, 1902
- Species: †M. celticus

Binomial name
- †Maiocercus celticus (Pocock, 1902)

Synonyms
- Brachypyge celtica Pocock, 1902; Maiocercus orbicularis Gill, 1911

= Maiocercus =

Maiocercus Temporal range: 310 Ma

Ancient genus of early Arachnids

Maiocercus celticus is a species of early trigonotarbid arachnid from the Upper Carboniferous of Westhoughton, Lancashire, UK. The species was first described in 1902, with a "new species" being described in 1911 (M. orbicularis) which has been proven as being a junior synonym of M. celticus.

M. celticus is the type species of the genus Maiocercus.

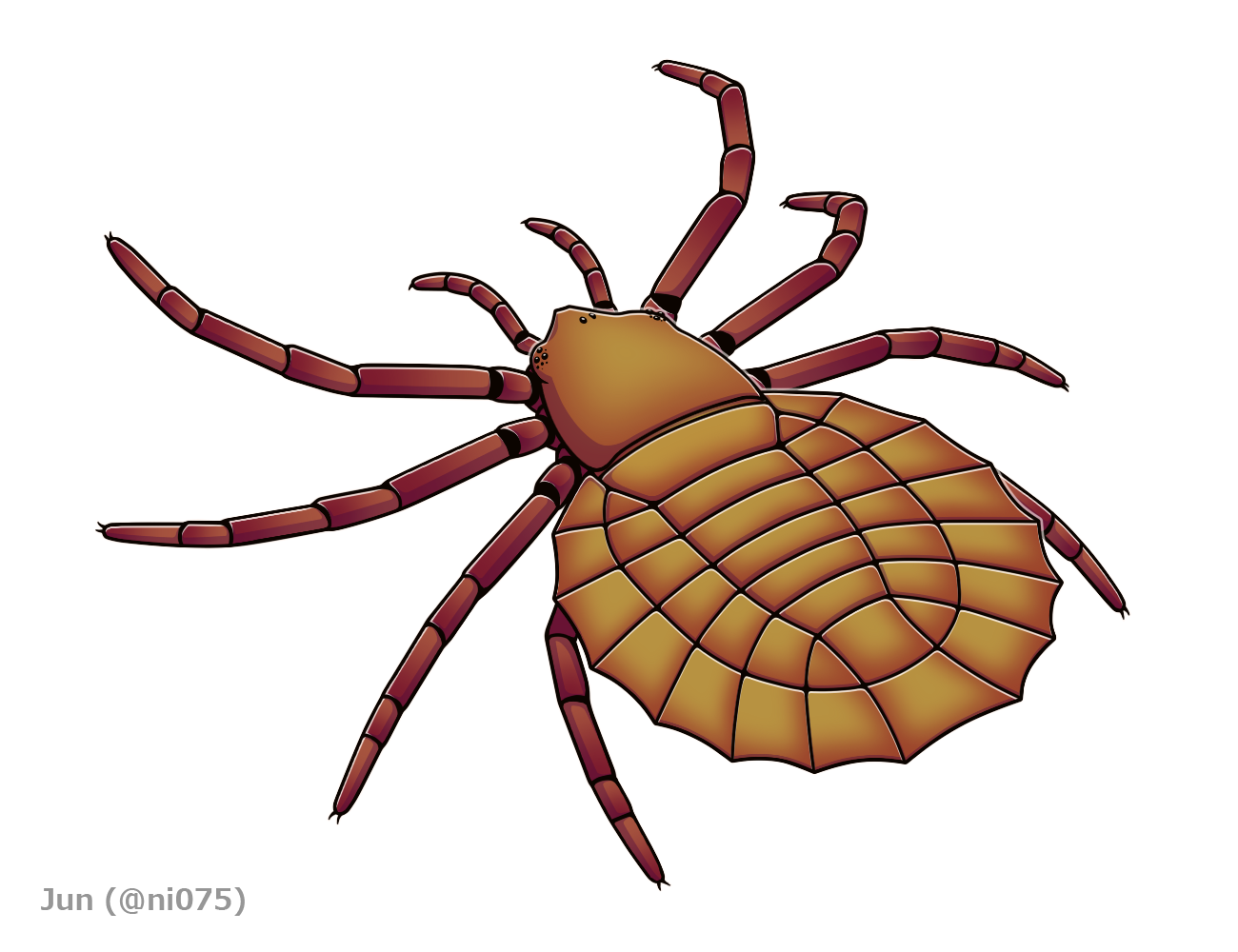
Artist's reconstruction of M. celticus, showing 5 rows of dorsal plates

Originally zoologist Reginald Innes Pocock compared M. celticus to Brachypyge, with later evidence showing that Brachypyge had "opisthosoma which were much longer than wide; with the pleural laminæ of the second and third pleura-bearing terga being inclined slightly backwards" (Brachypyge) with Maiocercus having the "opisthosoma much wider than long; the pleural laminæ of the first, second, third, and fourth sterna being inclined slightly forwards".

The original drawing which showed Maiocercus described a pitting on the underside of the slightly forwarded laminæ, with a non-uniform concavity on the outer margins of them. The concavity is most well-marked in the fifth, sixth, seventh and eighth somites, with the opposite happening on the second, third and fourth somites.

== See also ==
- Trigonotarbida
- Anthracomartidae
