= Lapworth Museum of Geology =

Coordinates: 52°26′56.80″N 1°55′55.80″W

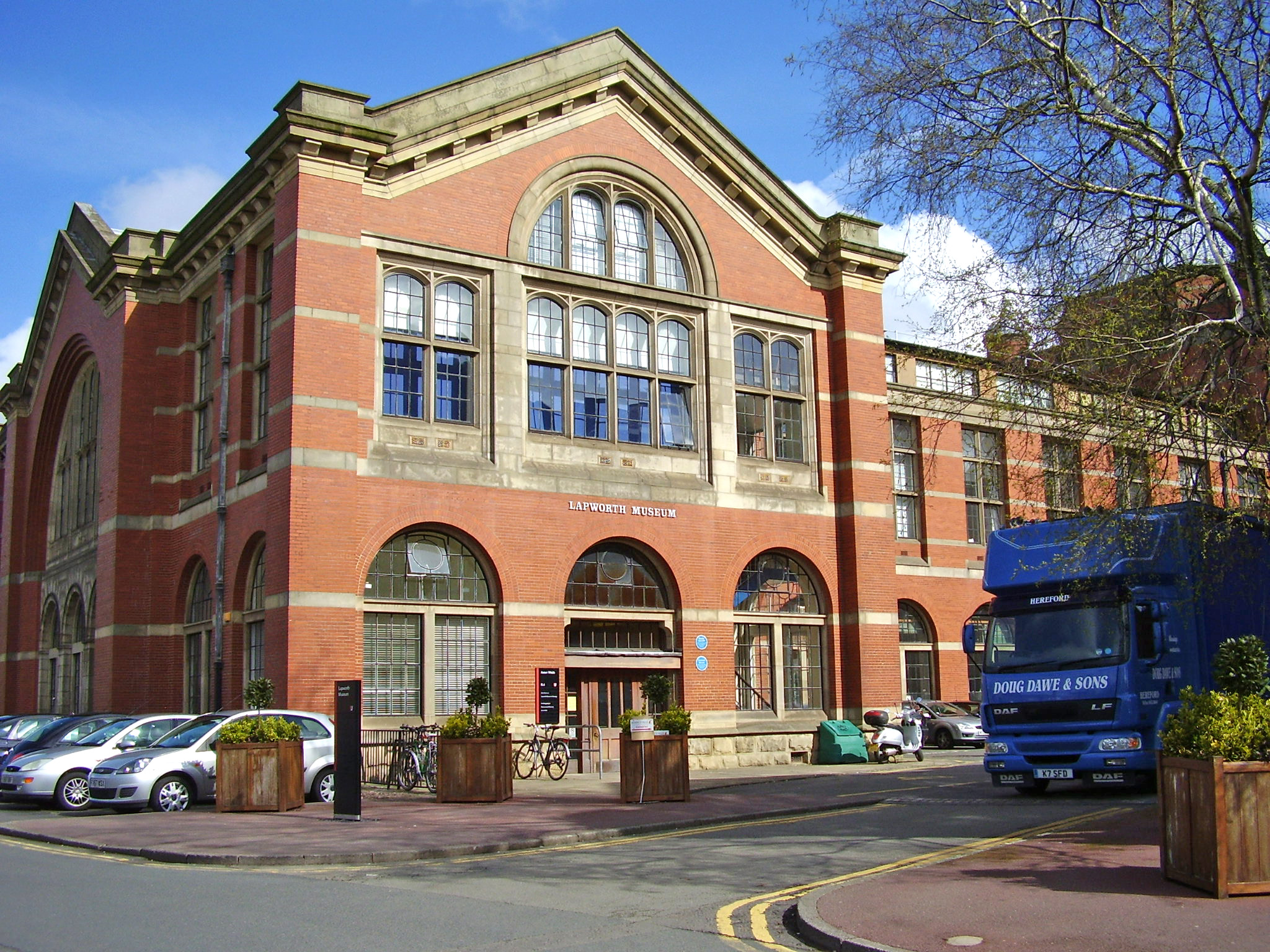
- Entrance to the Lapworth Museum
- Established: 1880
- Location: Edgbaston, Birmingham, West Midlands, England
- Type: Geological museum
- Visitors: c. 50,000
- Director: Jon Clatworthy
- Public transit access: University railway station
- Website: www.birmingham.ac.uk/cultural-attractions/lapworth-museum-of-geology

The Lapworth Museum of Geology is a geological museum run by the University of Birmingham and located on the university's campus in Edgbaston, south Birmingham, England. The museum is named after the geologist Charles Lapworth, its origins dating back to 1880. It reopened in 2016 following a £2.7 million redevelopment project that created new galleries and displays, as well as modern visitor and educational facilities.

The Lapworth Museum is free to visit; its galleries are aimed at a broad range of audiences, from families and children to undergraduate students and specialist geology groups. The galleries use the Lapworth's collections to tell the story of the evolution of life and the planet over 4.5 billion years of Earth's history, with a particular focus on how the environment, climate, plants, and animals of the English Midlands have changed over time. The Lapworth's collection includes more than 250,000 specimens of fossils, rocks and minerals that are of international scientific significance, as well as an important archive that documents key scientific discoveries and historical geologists. The Lapworth was one of five UK museums shortlisted for the Art Fund Museum of the Year Award in 2017.

== Exhibition and visitor facilities ==
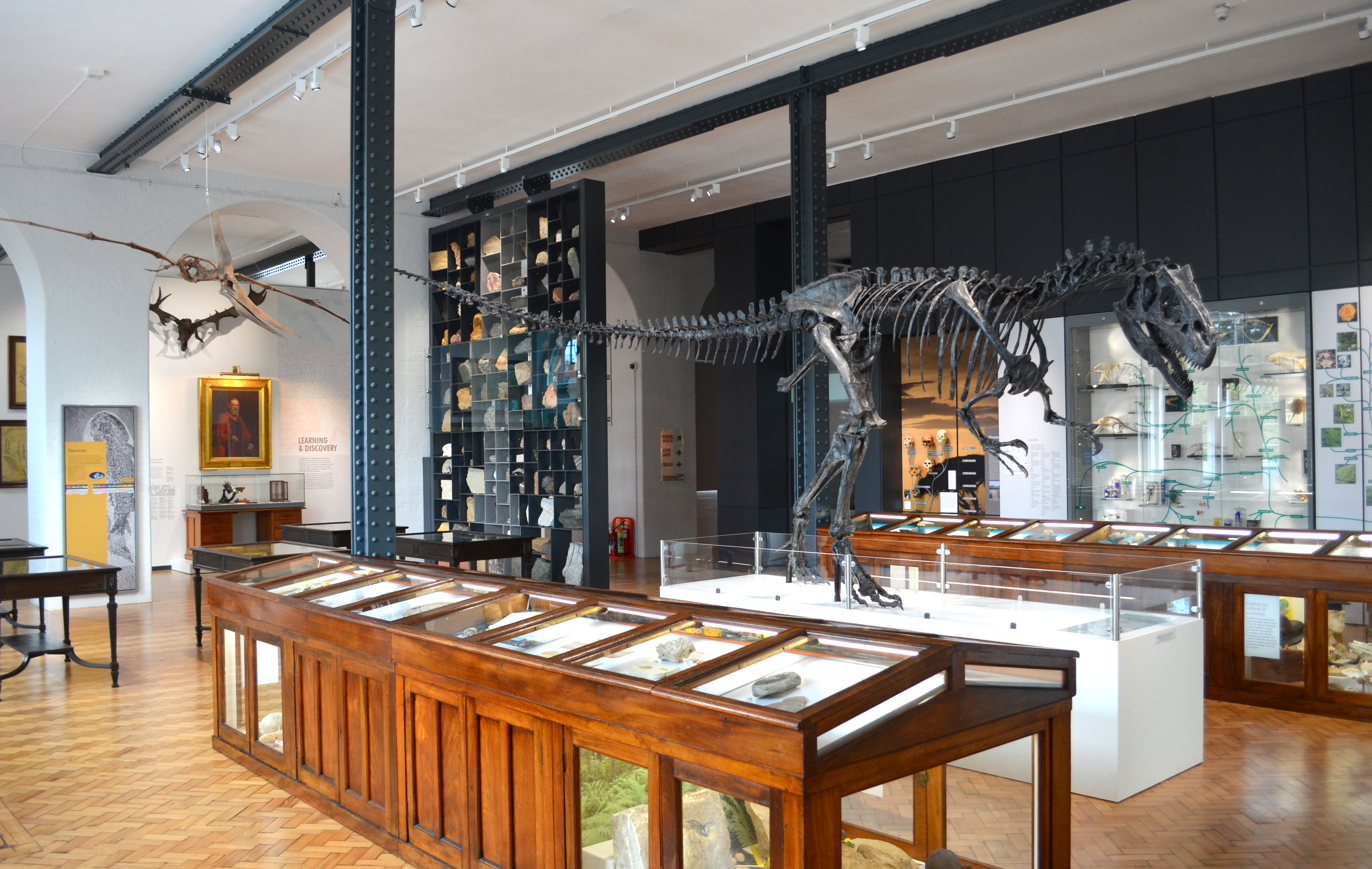
The Evolution of Life gallery

The Lapworth Museum contains three public galleries. The main hall of the Lapworth Museum forms the Evolution of Life gallery, and contains replica skeletons of the carnivorous dinosaur Allosaurus and the flying reptile Pteranodon, as well as a floor-to-ceiling rock wall showing the major rock types and explaining the rock cycle. The gallery uses the Lapworth's fossil collections to tell the story of life from the Precambrian to the present day. Animated reconstructions show the changing local environment of the Midlands at key points in Earth history, including tropical reefs in the Silurian Period, swampy rainforests in the Carboniferous Period, shallow oceans in the Jurassic Period, and ice age tundra during the Quaternary Period. The gallery also contains displays on modern biodiversity, human evolution, and the life and work of Charles Lapworth.

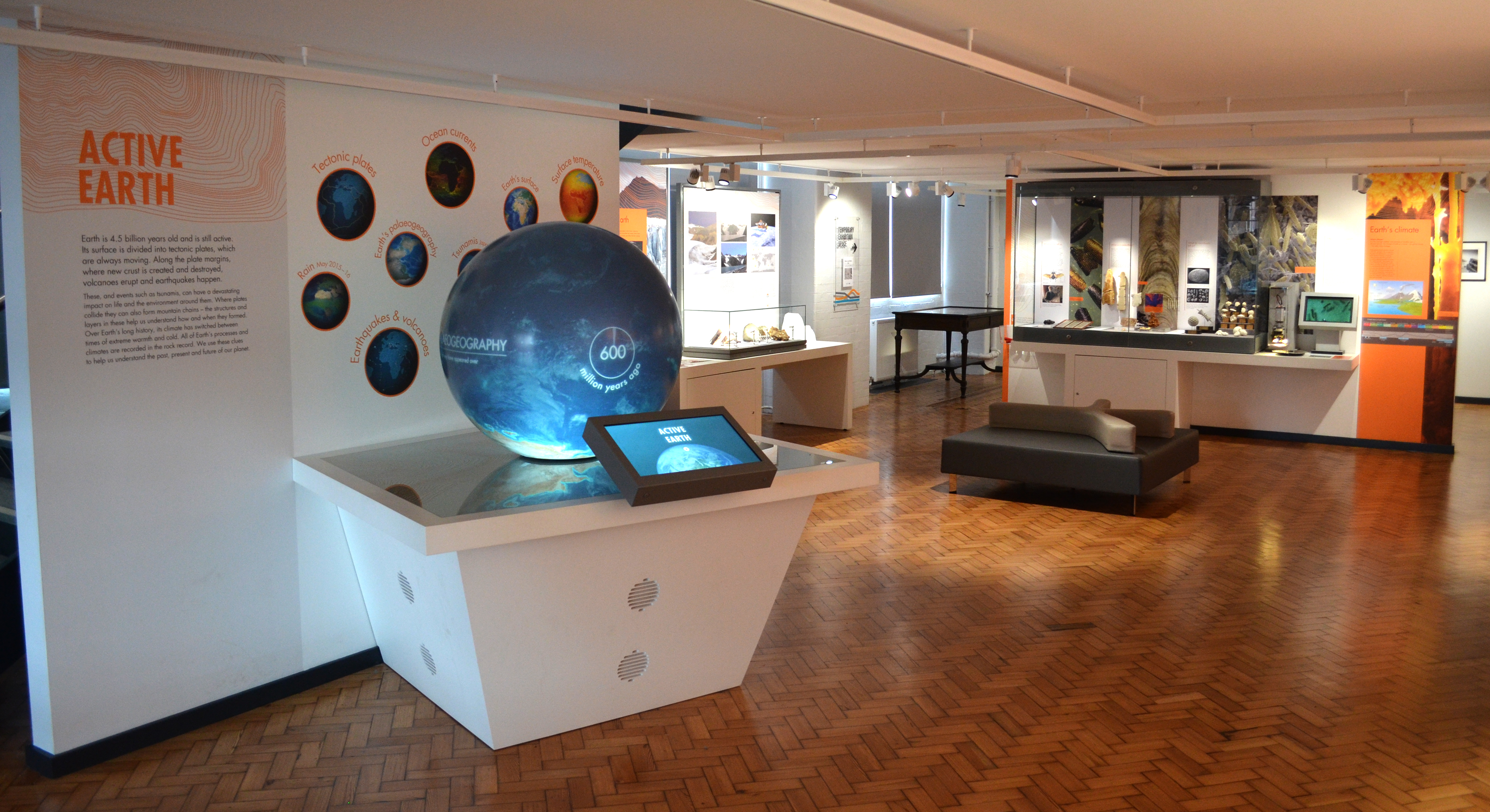
The Active Earth gallery

The Active Earth gallery explains Earth processes, including earthquakes, volcanoes, climate change and the formation of mountains. An interactive globe projector allows visitors to view datasets such as the changing positions of the continents through geological time. The Mineral Wealth gallery explores the diversity, excavation, classification and uses of minerals, and includes information on important local historical figures such as William Murdoch and Matthew Boulton, as well as gemstones and the Jewellery Quarter of Birmingham. There is also a display of fluorescent minerals that can be viewed under ultraviolet light.

Visitor facilities include a staffed reception desk, a small shop and cafe, and toilets. All galleries are fully accessible. There is a dedicated education room for the delivery of educational sessions, and a small temporary exhibition space featuring changing displays. The collections and archive are accessible to academic researchers and the public on request. The Lapworth also has an extensive volunteer programme.

== History ==
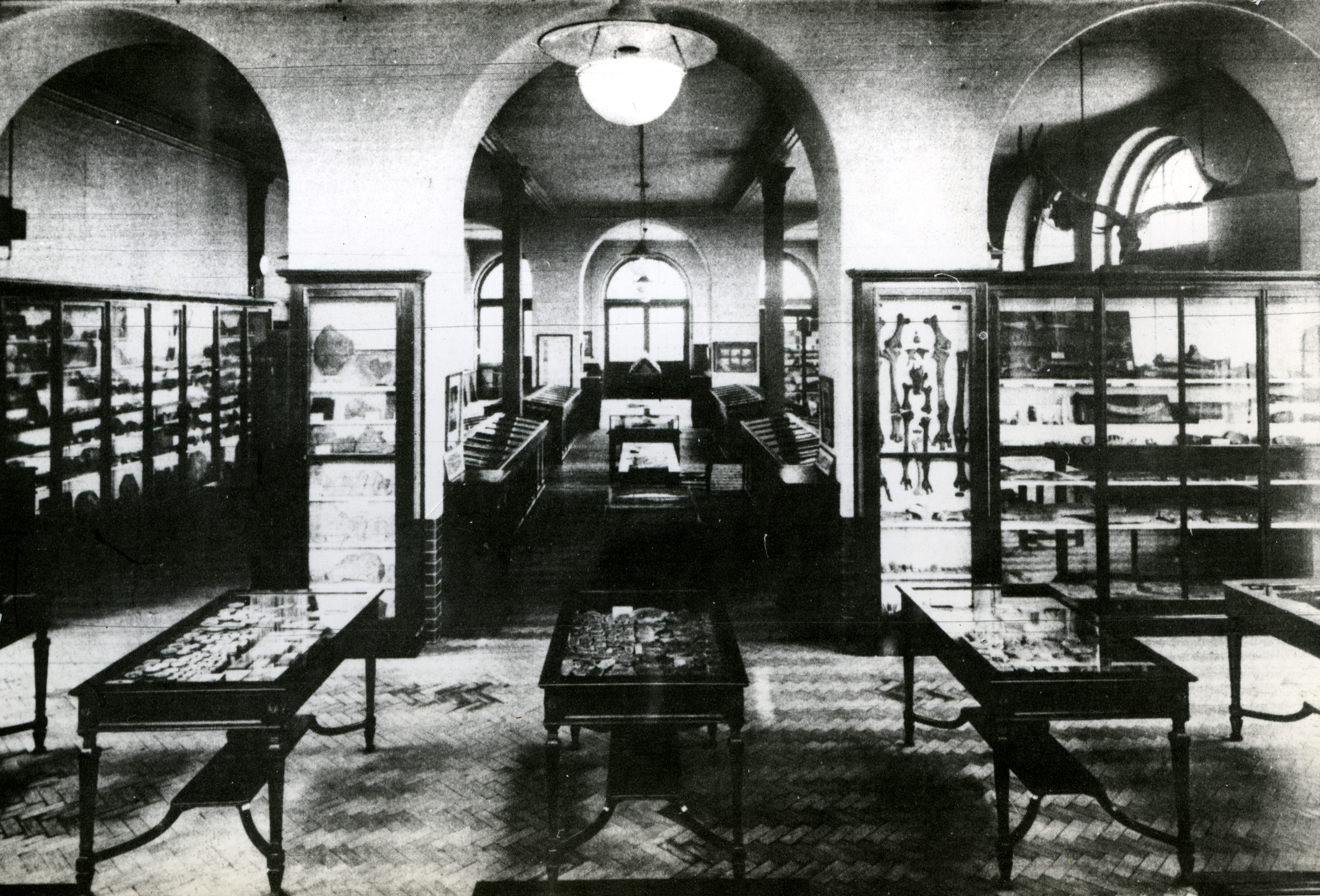
The exhibition hall, c. 1930

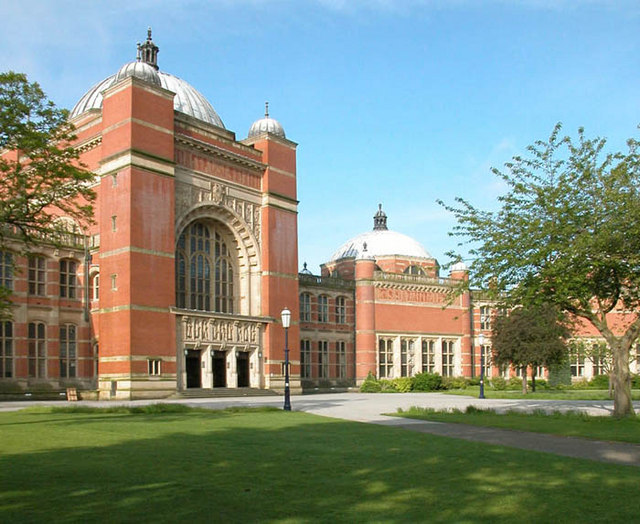
The Lapworth Museum is based in one of the wings of the historic Aston Webb building (pictured) on the main University of Birmingham campus.

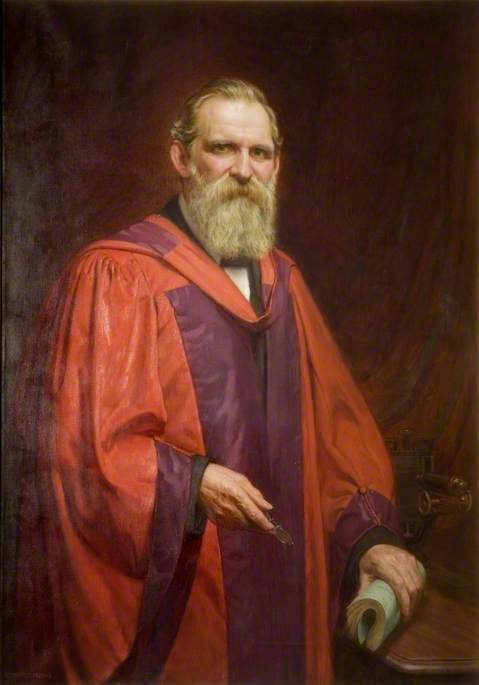
Charles Lapworth, after whom the museum is named

The Lapworth Museum is located within one of the wings of the Grade II* listed Aston Webb Building on the main campus of the University of Birmingham. The Aston Webb Building was designed by the architects Sir Aston Webb and Ingress Bell, and it retains many of its original Edwardian features. The Lapworth has occupied its current space from the 1920s, but the history of the museum dates back to 1880 and the foundation of Mason College, the forerunner of the University of Birmingham. The museum is named after Professor Charles Lapworth, an English geologist who was the first Professor of Geology at the university, and a key figure in 19th-century geological science. The Lapworth collections have long provided a teaching aid for the University of Birmingham's geology students, and are the subject of active research by palaeontologists, geologists, archaeologists and historians from the University of Birmingham and internationally.

=== Redevelopment project ===
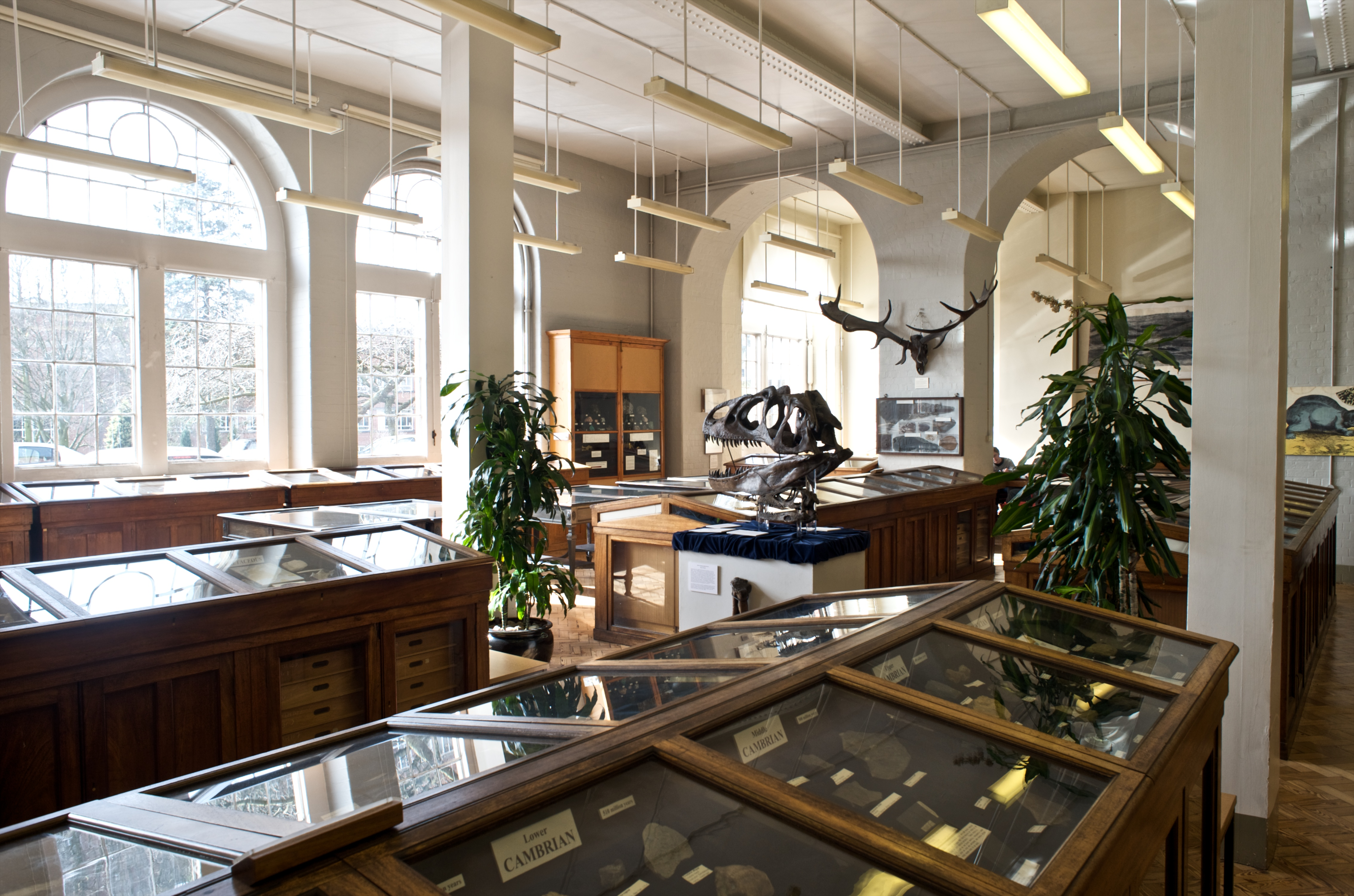
The museum in 2014, prior to its redevelopment

The Lapworth Museum closed to visitors in December 2014 for a £2.7m redevelopment project. The aims of this project were to completely redevelop and expand the galleries and displays, making them more accessible and appealing to a broader, non-academic audience, add key visitor and educational facilities that were previously missing (e.g. Education Room, reception desk, shop, cafe, toilets), make all museum spaces fully accessible, and upgrade the museum collections storage facilities. Funding for the redevelopment came from a major Heritage Lottery Fund grant of £1.693m, as well as from University of Birmingham alumni through the Circles of Influence campaign, and grants from Arts Council England and DCMS Wolfson.

The redevelopment project was delivered by Lapworth Museum and University of Birmingham staff and volunteers, in collaboration with external partners including Associated Architects, Real Studios (exhibition design), The Hub (exhibition fit-out) and Squint/Opera (AV design).

The museum was reopened in June 2016 by Sir Paul Nurse, the Nobel Prize winner and former president of the Royal Society, Professor David Eastwood, Vice-Chancellor of the University of Birmingham, and Professor Alice Roberts, the university's Professor of Public Understanding of Science.

== Collections and archive ==
The museum collection contains over 250,000 specimens of fossils, rocks and minerals, as well as geological maps, equipment, models, and photographic material, and also zoological specimens and stone axes. Also housed in the museum is the Lapworth Archive, a detailed and extensive archive of Charles Lapworth's work that represents one of the most complete archives of any 19th century geologist, as well as important archives relating to other significant 19th and 20th century geologists such as Professor L. J. Wills and Professor Fred Shotton. Archival material also documents the time spent at the University of Birmingham by the Chinese geologist Li Siguang, as well as the work of pioneering female scientists such as Dame Maria Ogilvie Gordon and Dame Ethel Shakespear. In 2008 the entire collection of the Lapworth was officially designated as of outstanding national and international importance by the Museums, Libraries and Archives Council, and subsequently by Arts Council England. The Lapworth is also accredited by Arts Council England. The significance of the Lapworth's collections to the scientific community is recognised by funding through the HEFCE Museums, Galleries and Collections Fund. In 2009, the Earth Science collection of the Birmingham Museum & Art Gallery was relocated to the Lapworth Museum as a long-term loan.

=== Palaeontology (fossil) collections ===
The strengths of the palaeontological collections reflect the geology of the local region, as well as the research interests of past and present University of Birmingham palaeontologists. One of the most important collections is of Silurian marine animals from the 428 million-year-old Wenlock Limestone of the Dudley area. The limestone records animals living in and around ocean floor reefs when the Midlands was covered by warm, shallow tropical seas. Fossils were primarily collected during the 18th and 19th century during quarrying of the limestone for use as flux during the production of iron. Key collections made in the 19th century by Charles Ketley and Sir Charles Holcroft were acquired by the Lapworth. Notable Wenlock Limestone specimens held within the museum include examples of the trilobite Calymene blumenbachii, more commonly known as the "Dudley Bug".

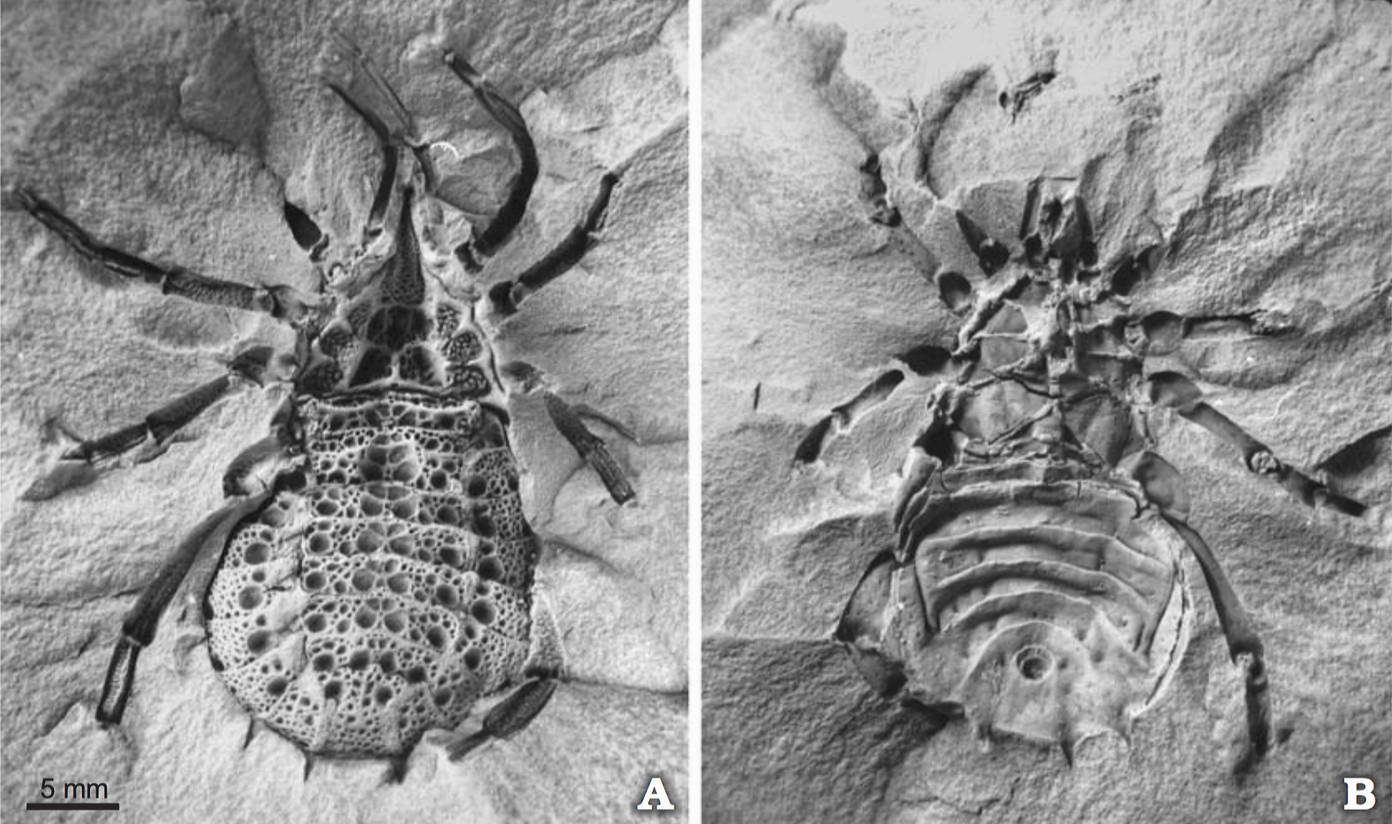
Specimen of the extinct trigonotarbid Eophrynus prestvicii held at the museum (A – dorsal view, B – ventral view)

The museum also includes an important collection of graptolites, marine colonial organisms that are highly important for correlating and dating rocks, as a result of the work of Charles Lapworth, who was a leading expert on the group. Other key collections include: plants and animals from the Coal Measures of the South Staffordshire Coalfield, particularly those preserved in exceptional condition in ironstone nodules from Coseley; ice age mammals such as mammoth and cave bear; exceptionally preserved fish fossils from Brazil, Italy, Lebanon and the USA; and specimens from famous international fossiliferous deposits such as the Solnhofen Limestone of southern Germany and the Burgess Shale of British Columbia.

=== Mineralogy collections ===
The Lapworth collections include around 12,000 minerals collected worldwide, but with particularly fine examples from the mining areas of Cornwall, Cumbria, Shropshire and Wanlockhead. The specimens include many from collections dating back to the eighteenth and nineteenth century, and from mines long since closed. A particularly important collection is that of William Murdoch, a Scottish engineer and inventor who worked at Soho House with James Watt and Matthew Boulton.

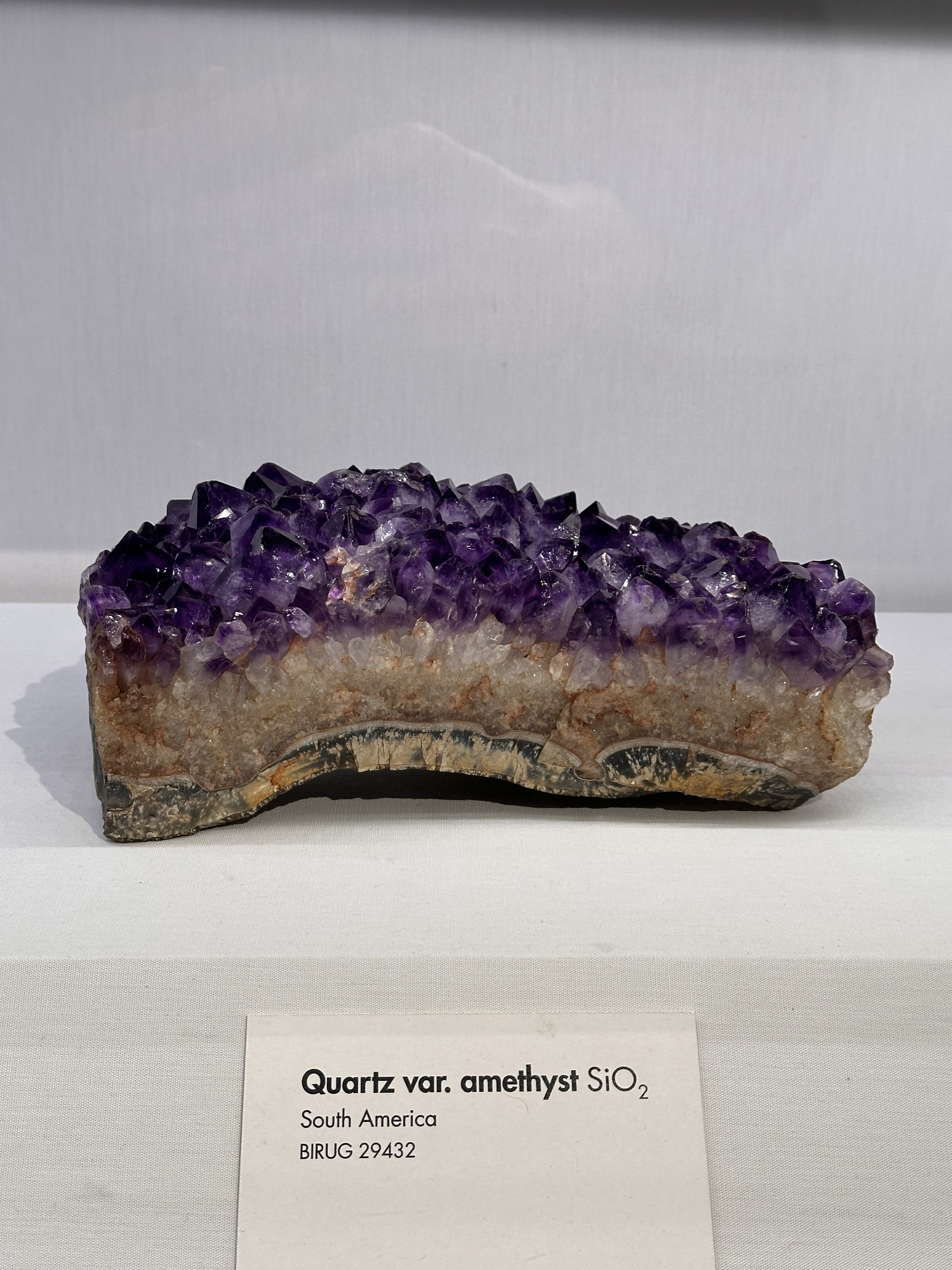
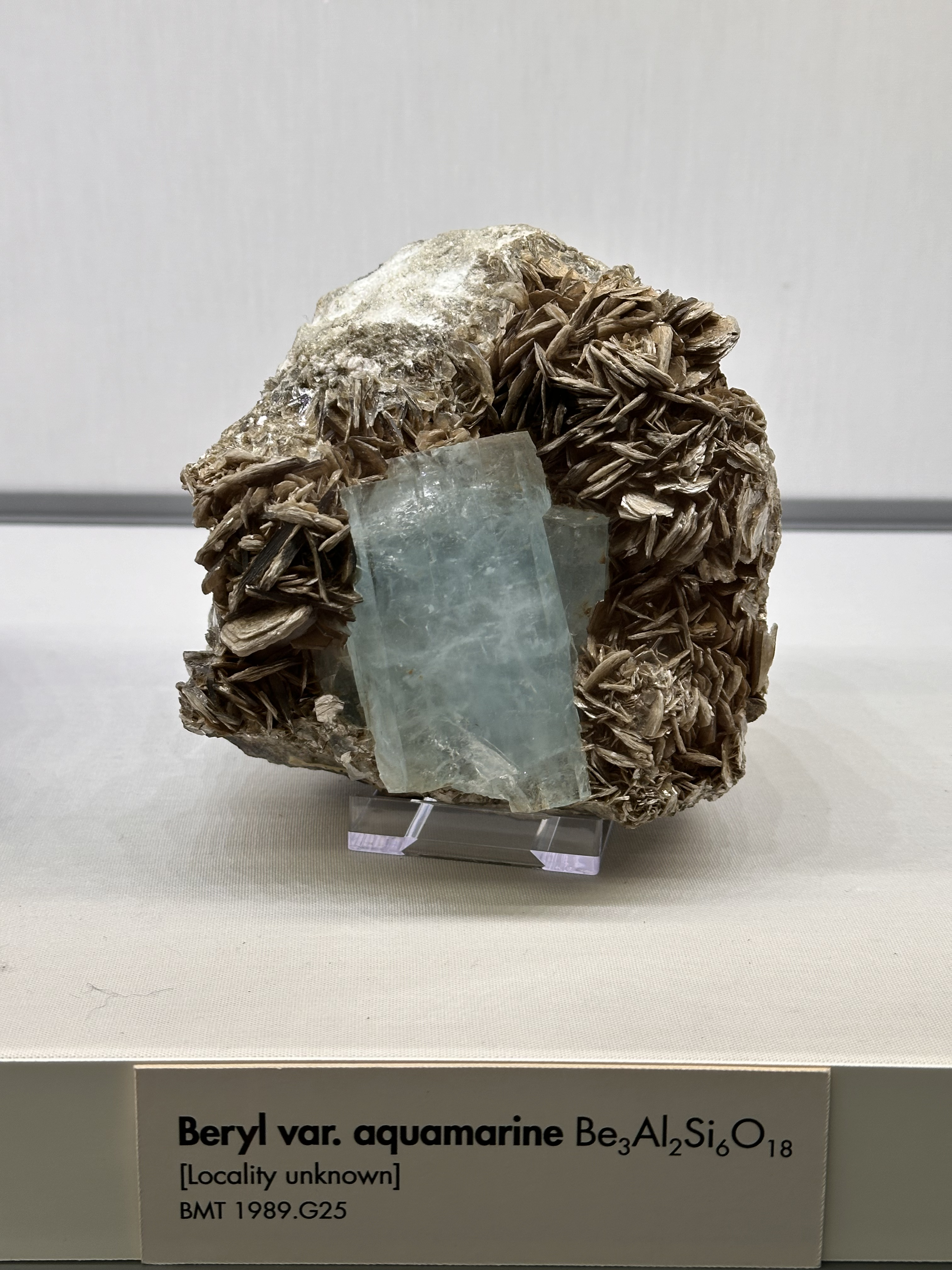
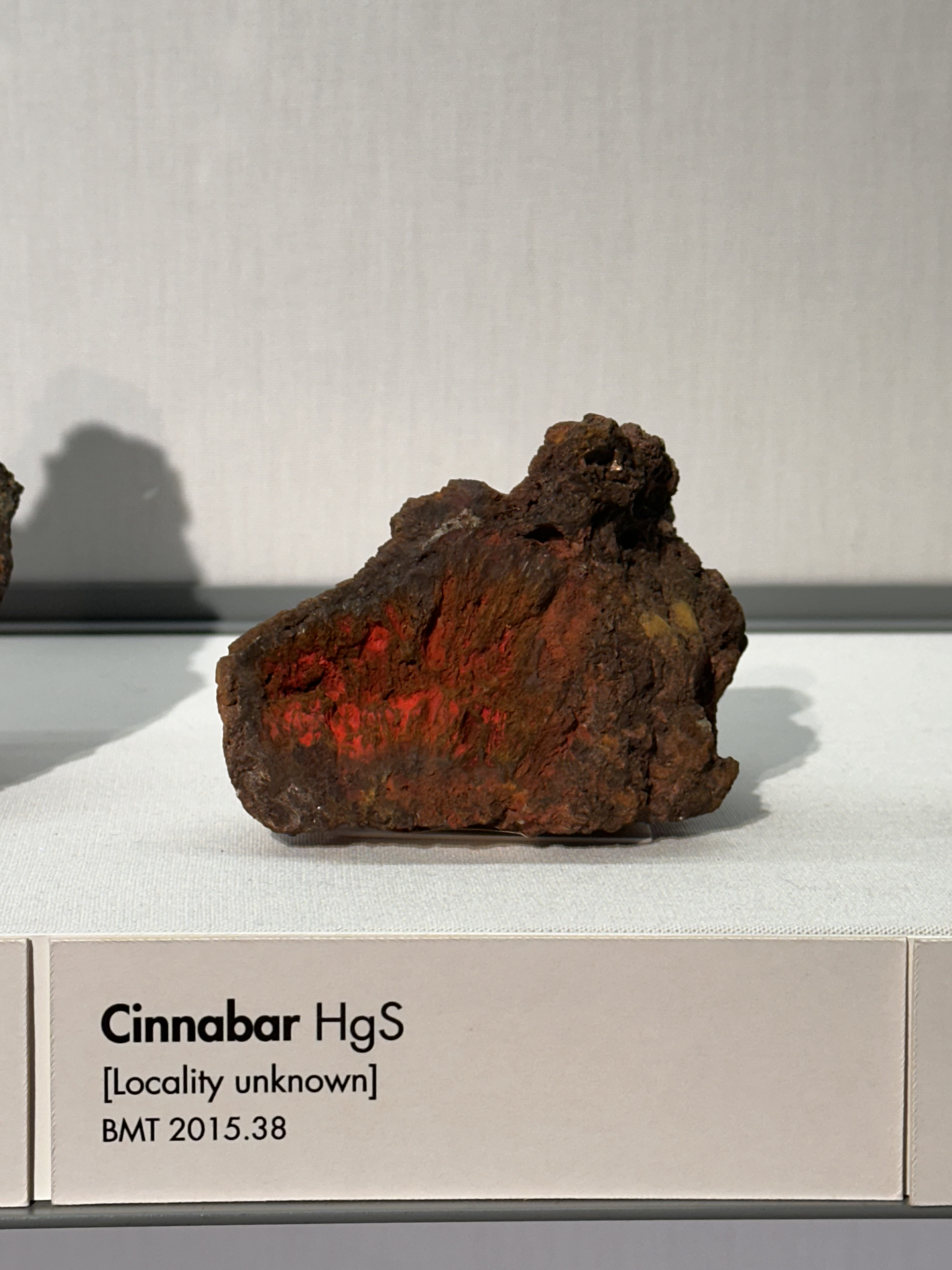
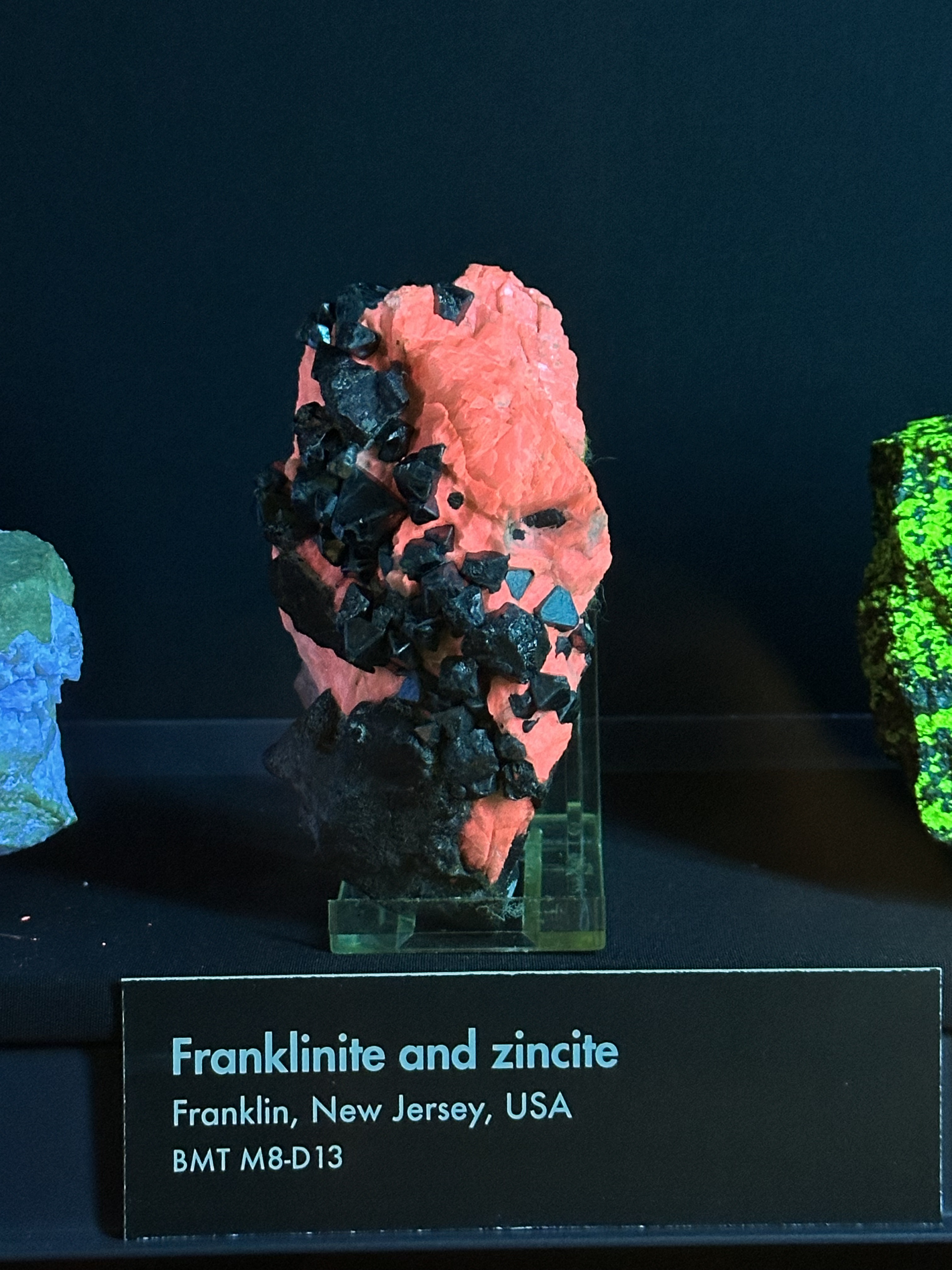
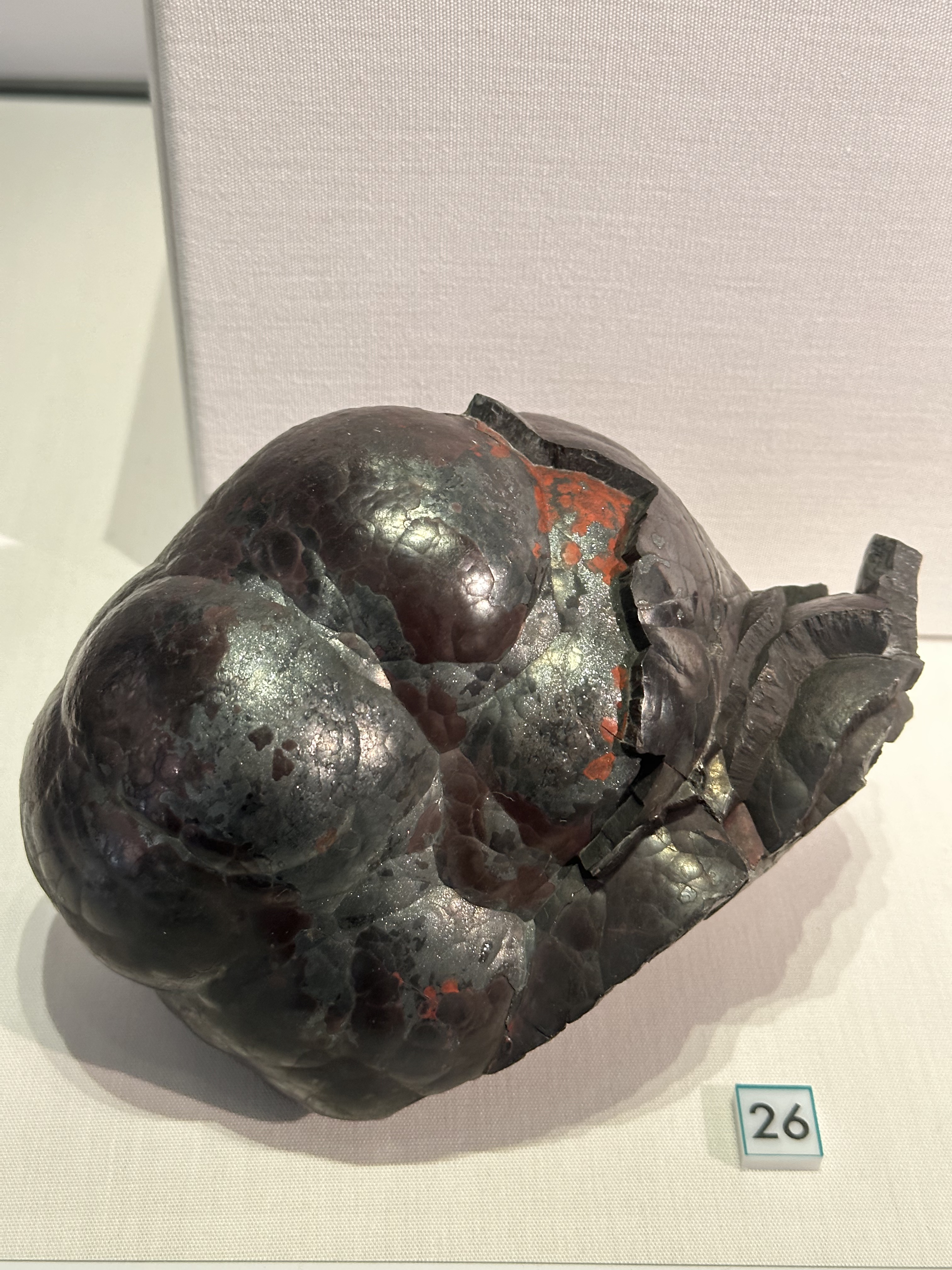
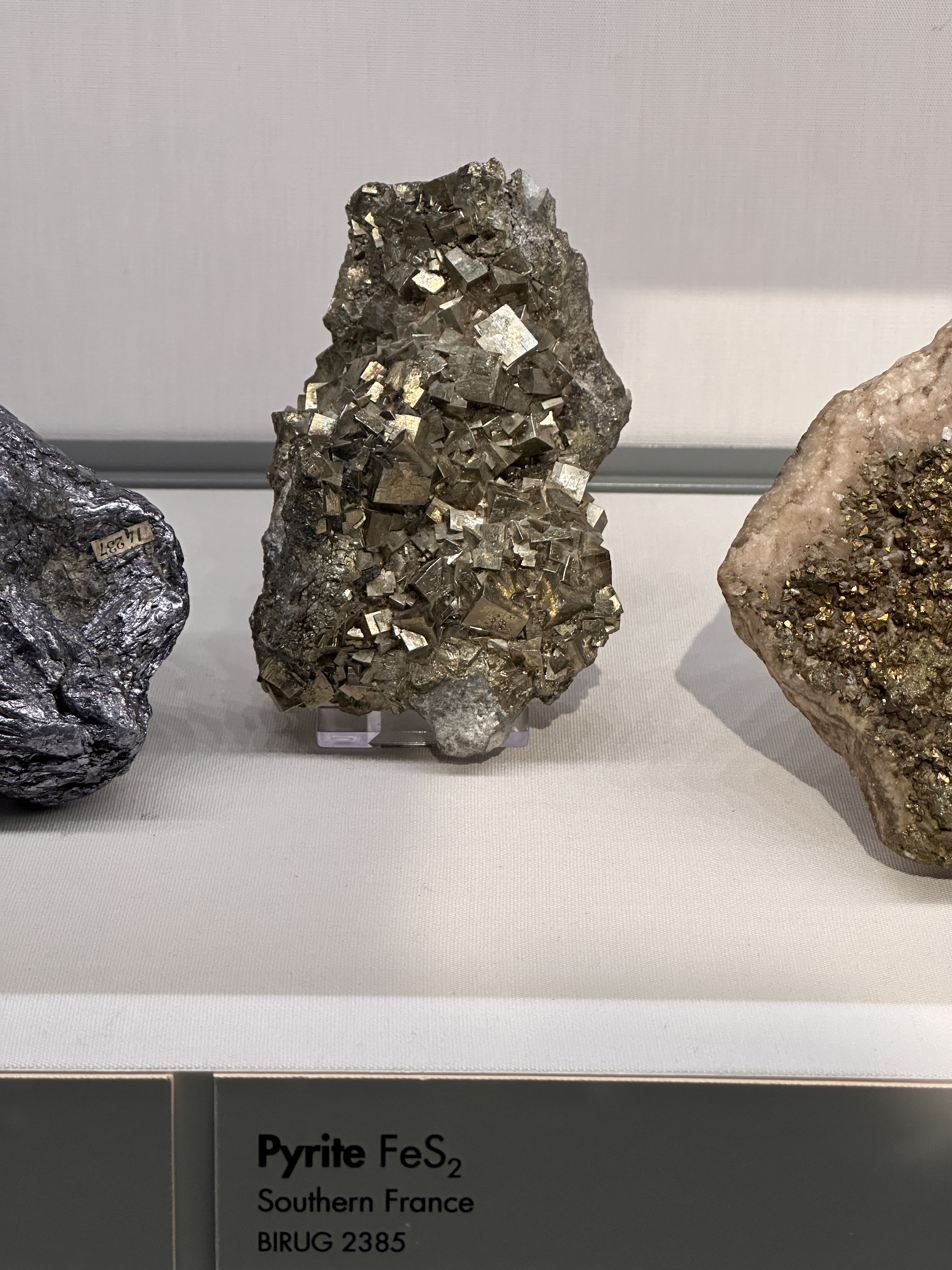
Clockwise from top-left: Amethyst, Aquamarine, Franklinite & Zincite under ultraviolet light, Pyrite, Hematite, Cinnabar

== Events and educational activities ==
Following the redevelopment project, the Lapworth launched a new education programme including workshops aimed at a range of key stages, all of which have been developed to link to the National Curriculum. The Lapworth is used by schools, colleges, home education groups, university and adult education groups as a teaching aid. Talks, hands on sessions and "behind the scenes" tours can be arranged for visiting groups wishing to learn more about natural history.

A new annual public lecture was established following the redevelopment of the Lapworth. The Keith Palmer Lecture Series, named after the lead individual donor to the redevelopment, was established to promote the public understanding of natural science by a distinguished invited speaker. The lectures are aimed at the non-academic community of the local region. The first Keith Palmer lecture in 2017 was given by Professor Kenneth Lacovara.

The Lapworth also organises a series of public talks, the 'Lapworth Lectures', by leading geologists and palaeontologists every other Monday, at 5pm, during term time. A full list of guest speakers and dates is provided on the museum's website.

The Lapworth runs a variety of family activities at the University of Birmingham's annual community festival each year. Details of the community festival and planned activities are provided on the University of Birmingham website. The Lapworth also participates in other regular University of Birmingham events, such as the annual Arts & Science Festival.

Temporary exhibitions are organised several times a year within the Lapworth's temporary exhibition space.
