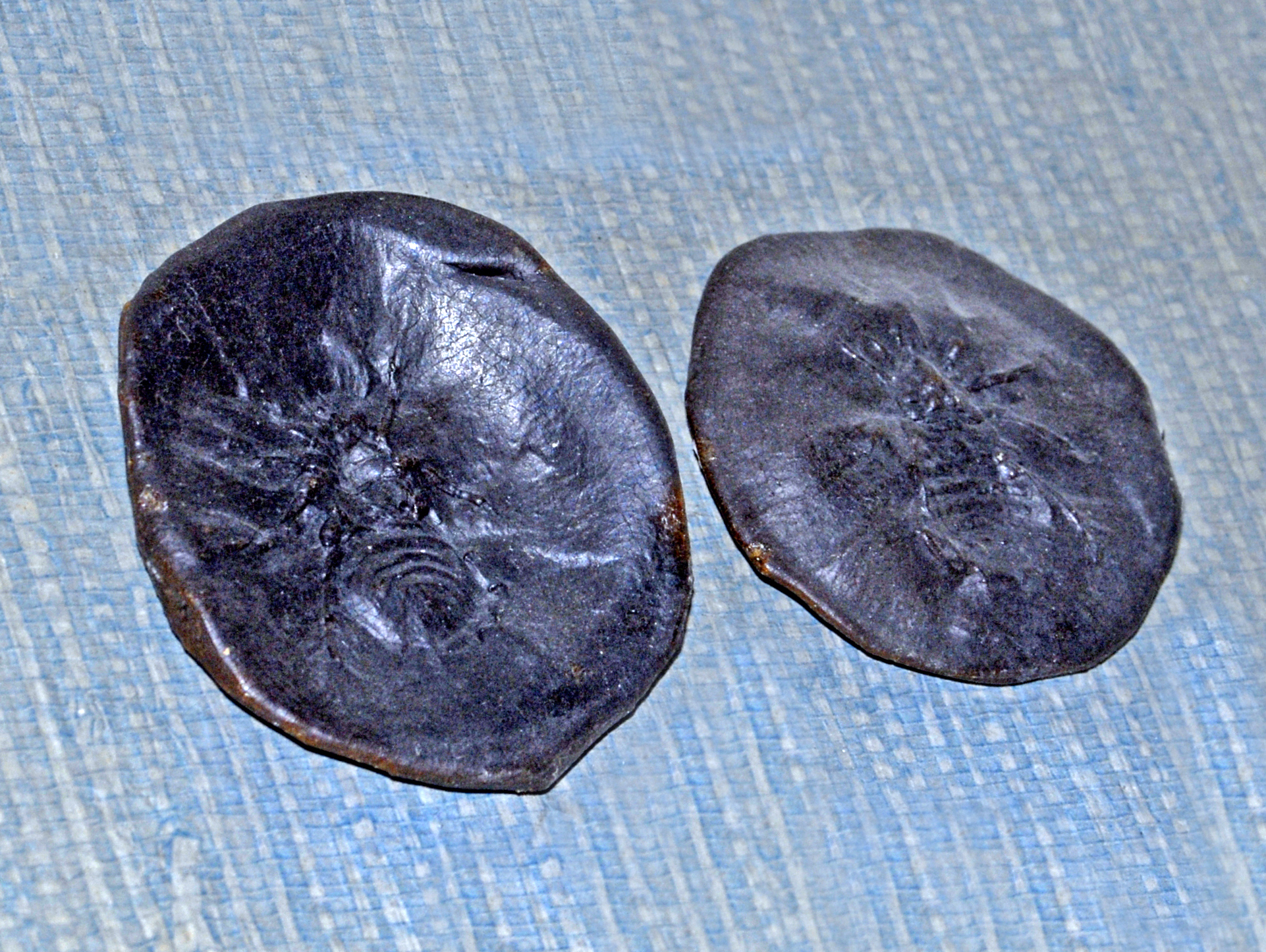
- Fossils of Eophrynus prestvicii from Dudley, United Kingdom, on display at Galerie de paléontologie et d'anatomie comparée in Paris

Scientific classification
- Domain: Eukaryota
- Kingdom: Animalia
- Phylum: Arthropoda
- Subphylum: Chelicerata
- Class: Arachnida
- Order: †Trigonotarbida
- Family: †Eophrynidae; Karsch, 1882

Genera
- See text

Synonyms
- Hemiphrynidae Frič, 1904

= Eophrynidae =

Extinct family of arachnids

Eophrynidae is a family of the extinct arachnid order Trigonotarbida. Eophrynids lived during the Carboniferous period in what is now modern Europe and North America. The family is probably found within the "eophrynid assemblage" clade: (Aphantomartus (Alkenia (Pseudokreischeria (Kreischeria (Eophrynus + Pleophrynus))))).

== Genera ==
- Areomartus Petrunkevitch, 1913
- Eophrynus Woodward, 1871
- Nyranytarbus Harvey & Selden, 1995
- Petrovicia Frič, 1904
- Planomartus Petrunkevitch, 1953
- Pleophrynus Petrunkevitch, 1945
- Pocononia Petrunkevitch, 1953
- Somaspidion Jux, 1982
- Stenotrogulus Frič, 1904
- Vratislavia Frič, 1904
