= Stenaelurillus bandama =

- Views of the male holotype with 1 mm (0.039 in) scale bars

Scientific classification
- Kingdom: Animalia
- Phylum: Arthropoda
- Subphylum: Chelicerata
- Class: Arachnida
- Order: Araneae
- Infraorder: Araneomorphae
- Family: Salticidae
- Genus: Stenaelurillus
- Species: S. bandama

Binomial name
- Stenaelurillus bandama Logunov & Azarkina, 2018

Species of jumping spider

Stenaelurillus bandama is a species of jumping spider that lives in Ivory Coast. A member of the genus Stenaelurillus that is named after the Bandama River, near to where it was first found, it was first described in 2018 by the arachnologists Dmitri Logunov and Galina Azarkina. It is a small spider with a forward section, or carapace, that is between 2.45 and 2.55 mm (0.096 and 0.100 in) long and, behind that, an abdomen that is between 2.4 and 3.1 mm (0.094 and 0.122 in) long, although the female is larger than the male. They also differ in colouration. The male's carapace is brown and has two white stripes that contrasts with the female's yellow carapace. The male's abdomen is dark brown has a pattern of spots and stripes while the female's is lighter brown and has a single spot and speckles.The male's face, clypeus, mouthparts, including its labium and maxillae, and legs are also brownish-yellow while the female's are yellow. The spider is similar to Stenaelurillus hirsutus, Stenaelurillus iubatus and Stenaelurillus striolatus but can be distinguished by the lack of hair, the presence of a wider vertical stripe on its clypeus and the elongated pocket in the female's epigyne, the visible external part of its copulatory organs.

== Taxonomy and etymology ==
Stenaelurillus bandama is a species of jumping spider, a member of the family Salticidae, that was first described by the arachnologists Dmitri Logunov and Galina Azarkina in 2018. They placed the species in the genus Stenaelurillus, which had been first circumscribed by the natural scientist Eugène Simon in 1886. In 2015, the evolutionary biologist Wayne Maddison undertook a phylogenetic classification that showed that the genus is a member of the subtribe Aelurillina in the tribe Aelurillini. He listed the tribe in the clade Saltafresia. Two years later, in 2017, the arachnologist Jerzy Prószyński grouped the genus with nine other genera of jumping spiders under the name Aelurillines.

The genus name relates to the genus Aelurillus, which itself derives from the Greek word for 'cat', with the addition of a Greek stem meaning 'narrow'. The spider is named after the Bandama River, which runs near to the place the species was first found.

== Description ==
The spider is medium-sized. The male has a brown frontal section, or carapace, that is typically 2.45 mm (0.096 in) long and 1.8 mm (0.071 in) wide. It is covered in dark brown scales and has two wide stripes made of white scales running down the middle from to the back. There is a fovea between the last row of eyes but this is hard to see due to the scales. Its eye field has a covering of short, protruding white-transparent iridescent hairs. The underside of its cephalothorax, or sternum, is brown. Its face, or clypeus is brownish yellow and is marked with vertical stripes of short dense black hairs. The middle of clypeus and its cheeks are covered with long, white-transparent iridescent hairs. There are similar hairs on the middle of its brown-yellow chelicerae. Its remaining mouthparts, including its labium and maxillae, are brownish-yellow.

Behind its carapace, the spider's abdomen is dark brown on top with a pattern of three white spots and two stripes and yellow with a pattern of four stripes of brown hair underneath. It measures typically 2.4 mm (0.094 in) long and 1.5 mm (0.059 in) wide. Its book lung covers are yellow and its spinnerets, used to spin webs, are brown, the upper pair being darker than the lower pair. Its legs and pedipalps are also brownish-yellow, but its legs have brown and yellow hairs while those on its pedipalps are long and white.

At the end of its pedipalp is the male's spider's copulatory organs. There two bumps on its palpal tibia and two small spikes, or tibial apophyses. At the end of the pedipalp, there is a relatively large cymbium that has a tuft of dense hair at the end. Attached to the cymbium is an elongated palpal bulb that has a pointed bulge at its base and two lumps called a distal projection and a short tegular process at the top. Near to these projections is the spider's very small sharp embolus that is shaped like a nail. The male is similar to Stenaelurillus hirsutus, but differs in having wide vertical stripes on the clypeus and the narrowness of the embolus. It can be distinguished from Stenaelurillus striolatus by the lack of a hair cover to the clypeus.

The female is similar to the male in shape but slightly larger. It has a yellow carapace that is covered in brown scales and is typically 2.55 mm (0.100 in) long and 1.9 mm (0.075 in) wide. Its eye field is covered in short erect brown bristles. Its sternum is light yellow as are its chelicerae, labium and maxillae, while its light yellow clypeus has a scattering of white hairs on it. Its abdomen, which has a typical length of 3.1 in (79 mm) and width of 2.45 mm (0.096 in), is brown on top with light yellow sides and yellow underneath. It is a pattern of brown elongated speckles and a long white spot on the top. Its book lung covers, spinnerets and legs are also yellow.

The female's epigyne, the external visible part of its copulatory organs, has a flat plate and a deep pocket. Its two copulatory openings are orientated transversely and line up close to the epigastric furrow at the back of the epigyne. It has short tube-shaped insemination ducts that lead to large round primary spermathecae, or receptacles. These receptacles have extended ends that contain the festilization ducts The female can be confused with Stenaelurillus iubatus, but can be distinguished by the longer pocket in the epigyne and shorter insemination ducts.

== Distribution and habitat ==
Stenaelurillus spiders are found across Africa and Asia. Stenaelurillus bandama is endemic to Ivory Coast. The holotype was identified based on a specimen collected near Korhogo on the Bandama River in 1980. It is known only from that local area. It has been found in areas of riparian forest and savanna.
