= Stenaelurillus pilosus =

- The male holotype with 1 mm (0.039 in) scale bars

Scientific classification
- Kingdom: Animalia
- Phylum: Arthropoda
- Subphylum: Chelicerata
- Class: Arachnida
- Order: Araneae
- Infraorder: Araneomorphae
- Family: Salticidae
- Genus: Stenaelurillus
- Species: S. pilosus

Binomial name
- Stenaelurillus pilosus Wesołowska & A. Russell-Smith, 2011

Species of jumping spider

Stenaelurillus pilosus is a species of jumping spider that is endemic to Nigeria. A member of the genus Stenaelurillus, the spider is medium-sized, with a body length that ranges between 4.9 and 6.4 mm (0.19 and 0.25 in). Its pear-shaped carapace, the upper hard part of its front section, has a dense mat of very long black forward-pointing bristles covering its front portion and two yellow stripes running down its back. The male has a shiny dark brown hard scutum on the top of its rear section, or abdomen. It can be distinguished from other species in the genus by the dark brown band on its face, or clypeus, the distinctive long orangish-brown hairs on its black eye field, the presence of two fissure-like openings in the female's epigyne, the external visible part of its copulatory organs, and the male's straight embolus in its reproductive_system. It was first described in 2011 by the arachnologists Wanda Wesołowska and Anthony Russell-Smith.

== Taxonomy and etymology ==
Stenaelurillus pilosus is a species of jumping spider, a member of the family Salticidae, that was first described by the arachnologists Wanda Wesołowska and Anthony Russell-Smith in 2011. It is one of over 500 species identified by the Polish arachnologist Wesołowska. They placed the species in the genus Stenaelurillus, which had been first circumscribed by the natural scientist Eugène Simon in 1886. In 2015, the evolutionary biologist Wayne Maddison undertook a phylogenetic classification that showed that the genus is a member of the subtribe Aelurillina in the tribe Aelurillini. He listed the tribe in the clade Saltafresia. Two years later, in 2017, the arachnologist Jerzy Prószyński grouped the genus with nine other genera of jumping spiders under the name Aelurillines.

The genus name relates to the genus Aelurillus, which itself derives from the Greek word for 'cat', with the addition of a Greek stem meaning 'narrow'. The spider's specific name relates to the long bristles on the outside of the carapace on the male of the species.

== Description ==
The spider is medium sized with a body that is divided into two main parts: an oval cephalothorax, behind that, and a slightly thinner abdomen. The male has a cephalothorax that measures typically 2.6 mm (0.10 in) in length and 2.1 mm (0.083 in) in width. It has a brown pear-shaped carapace, the hard upper section of its cephalothorax, which is edged with dark iridescent bristles, and is marked with two yellow stripes covered white scales that run down the thorax. There is a dense mat of very long black forward-pointing bristles that extend across the front half of its carapace. Its eye field is short and almost black, Its brownish yellow clypeus, or face, is marked by a pattern of a narrow black rectangle in a white frame and a wide stripe formed of white scales or vertical stripes of short dense black hairs. It has a covering of dark brown hairs and scales. In some specimens, the eye field is brown with distinctive mane of brown and transparent hairs and dense white hairs around the front row of the spider's eyes. The underside of its cephalothorax, or sternum, is yellow and covered in white hairs. Its mouthparts, including its chelicerae, labium and maxillae, are similarly yellow.

The male's abdomen is oval, black-brown and between 2.3 and 2.6 mm (0.091 and 0.102 in) long and 1.65 and 2.0 mm (0.065 and 0.079 in) wide. The shape of the abdomen differs from other species of Stenaelurillus, which are typically oblong. The upper surface is covered in a shiny dark brown hard scutum and has three rounded whitish spots visible towards the rear. It is yellow on its sides and underneath. The spider's book lung covers are light yellow, its spinnerets are long and black and its legs are light brown. Its light yellow pedipalps are covered in long white hairs.

At the end of its pedipalp is the male's spider's copulatory organs. Its palpal tibia is small and has a small spike, or tibial apophyses, that points upwards. At the end of the pedipalp, there is a relatively large cymbium and, attached to the cymbium, an elongated palpal bulb that has a pointed bulge at its base and two lumps at the top. Near to these projections is the spider's very small blunt embolus. The spider's palpal bulb is similar to Stenaelurillus hirsutus, Stenaelurillus glaber and Stenaelurillus striolatus. However, its [[[Embolus (spider anatomy)|embolus]] is distinct as it is straight. The spider can also be distinguished from these species by the fact that its clypeus has a dark brown band. In addition to its clypeus, compared to the related Stenaelurillus cristatus, its pedipalp is plain yellow and lacks any markings.

The female is similar in size to the male, with a cephalothorax that measures between 2.6 and 2.8 mm (0.10 and 0.11 in) long and 2.0 mm (0.079 in) wide and an abdomen that is between 3.4 and 3.6 mm (0.13 and 0.14 in) long and 2.7 and 2.8 mm (0.11 and 0.11 in) wide. Its carapace is similar to the male apart from its eye field, which has a covering of dense brown hairs that are rod-like and particularly common near the front of the spider. Its abdomen is also different as it is brown and has an indistinct pattern of three spots and two lines on its upper side and is mottled with dark patches on its sides. Underneath, the spider's abdomen has a pattern of two lines of dark dots on its surface. Its legs are light brown like the male's. It has an oval epigyne, the external visible part of its copulatory organs, that has two fissure-like copulatory openings that are widely separated slits. It has a narrow shallow pocket. These features of the epigyne distinguish it from other spiders. Otherwise, the spider is very similar to Stenaelurillus iubatus, with one of the original examples of Stenaelurillus pilosus later being recognised as a paratype of the other species.

== Distribution and habitat ==
Stenaelurillus spiders are found across Africa and Asia. Stenaelurillus pilosus is endemic to Nigeria. The holotype for the species was collected near Ibadan in 1973 along with other examples that were living nearby. The spider has been found in both fallow bush and on roadside verges.
