= Stenaelurillus iubatus =

Scientific classification
- Kingdom: Animalia
- Phylum: Arthropoda
- Subphylum: Chelicerata
- Class: Arachnida
- Order: Araneae
- Infraorder: Araneomorphae
- Family: Salticidae
- Genus: Stenaelurillus
- Species: S. iubatus

Binomial name
- Stenaelurillus iubatus Wesołowska & A. Russell-Smith, 2011

Species of spider

Stenaelurillus iubatus is a jumping spider species in the genus Stenaelurillus that is endemic to Nigeria. It has a distinctive mane-like long hairs on its black eye field, which is recalled in the specific name that is derived from the Latin for 'mane'. First described in 2011 by Wanda Wesołowska and Anthony Russell-Smith, the spider is medium-sized with a total body length between 5 and 6.2 mm (0.20 and 0.24 in). The spider is generally dark brown on its upper surface, the male being marked with two stripes of white scales on its front section, its carapace, and the female with a heart-shaped white spot on its rear section, or abdomen. It can be distinguished from other species in the genus by its copulatory organs, particularly the ribbon-shaped embolus.on the male's palpal bulb and female's highly sclerotized epigyne with its narrow pocket and widely separated fissure-like copulatory openings.

== Taxonomy and etymology ==
Stenaelurillus iubatus is a species of jumping spider, a member of the family Salticidae, that was first described by the arachnologists Wanda Wesołowska and Anthony Russell-Smith in 2011. It is one of over 500 species identified by Wesołowska. They allocated it to the genus Stenaelurillus, first raised by Eugène Simon in 1886. circumscribed by the natural scientist Eugène Simon in 1886. In 2015, the evolutionary biologist Wayne Maddison undertook a phylogenetic classification that showed that the genus is a member of the subtribe Aelurillina in the tribe Aelurillini. He listed the tribe in the clade Saltafresia. Two years later, in 2017, the arachnologist Jerzy Prószyński grouped the genus with nine other genera of jumping spiders under the name Aelurillines.

The genus name relates to the genus Aelurillus, which itself derives from the Greek word for 'cat', with the addition of a Greek stem meaning 'narrow'. The spider's specific name derives from the Latin for mane and recalls the hairs behind the male's eye field.

== Description ==
The spider is medium-sized with a body that is divided into two main parts: a more rectangular cephalothorax and a more oval abdomen that has a flat front edge. The male has a cephalothorax that measures 2.7 mm (0.11 in) in length, between 1.8 and 2.0 mm (0.071 and 0.079 in) in width and between 1.1 and 1.6 mm (0.043 and 0.063 in) in height. It has a dark brown oval carapace, its hard upper portion, that is covered in dark scales, except for two stripes of white scales on the thorax, and edged with white streaks. There is a dense covering of distinctive long orange brownish or fawn-coloured hairs on the spider's black eye field, with black scales visible near its foremost eyes, and white hairs covering much of the sides at the back. Its sternum, the underside of its carapace, is dark brown and the part of its face known as its clypeus is velvet black. Its chelicerae are dark brown and covered in dark hairs. The remainder of the spider's mouthparts, its labium and maxilae, are brown with paler tips.

The spider's abdomen is a slightly flattened oval that is between 2.3 and 2.6 mm (0.091 and 0.102 in) long and 1.65 and 1.9 mm (0.065 and 0.075 in) wide. The shape of the abdomen differs from other species of Stenaelurillus, which are typically oblong. On top, it is dark brown and there is a large blackish hard shield-like scutum that takes up much of the area in the middle. Underneath, it is lighter. Its spinnerets, which it uses to spin webs, are brown and its pedipalps are blackish brown and covered in dense black hairs.

At the end of its pedipalp is the male's spider's copulatory organs. Its palpal tibia is small and features three bumps, one of which mounts a short spike, or , or tibial apophyses. At the end of the pedipalp, there is a smooth cymbium that has an area of dense hairs on its side. Attached to the cymbium is am rounded palpal bulb that has a pointed bulge at its base and a flattened tegular process at the top. Near to these projections is the spider's ribbon-like embolus. As well as the shape of its embolus, the presence of a hairy mane around the eye field helps differentiate the species from others in the genus.

The female is very similar to Stenaelurillus pilosus, with one of the original examples later being recognised as a paratype of this species. It is similar in size to the male, with a cephalothorax between 2.8 and 2.95 mm (0.110 and 0.116 in) long and 2.0 and 2.15 mm (0.079 and 0.085 in) wide and an abdomen between 3.0 and 3.25 in (76 and 83 mm) long and 2.2 and 2.55 mm (0.087 and 0.100 in) wide. Its carapace is slightly pear-shaped and has indistinct light streaks on its surface. Its eye field is dark brown and is covered in long brown bristles. Its thorax has a covering of light hairs. Its sternum is orange or light yellow and covered in a dense layer of white hairs. Its chelicerae are yellow with a hint of brown while its labium and maxillae are light yellow, sometimes with a darker base.

The female's abdomen varies between species. In some cases it is grey-brown with a light heart-shaped spot on the end and in others it is brown with a wide yellow stripe across its ends and a large yellow spot in the middle. Its book lung covers are light yellow and its spinnerets are yellowish-grey. Its epigyne, the external visible part of the female copulatory organs, is marked by its flat plate and narrow pocket. It is highly sclerotized and has a and widely separated fissured copulatory openings that are placed to form a single line. It has short tube-shaped insemination ducts that lead to large round spermathecae, or receptacles. The shape of its epigyne distinguishes it from other spiders. Its insemination ducts are longer and its epigynal pocket is shorter than those found in the related Stenaelurillus bandama.

== Distribution and habitat ==
Stenaelurillus spiders are found across Africa and Asia. Stenaelurillus iubatus is endemic to Nigeria. The holotype for the species was found near Ibadan, Oyo State in 1973. It has been found in fallow bush and on the verge of a road.
