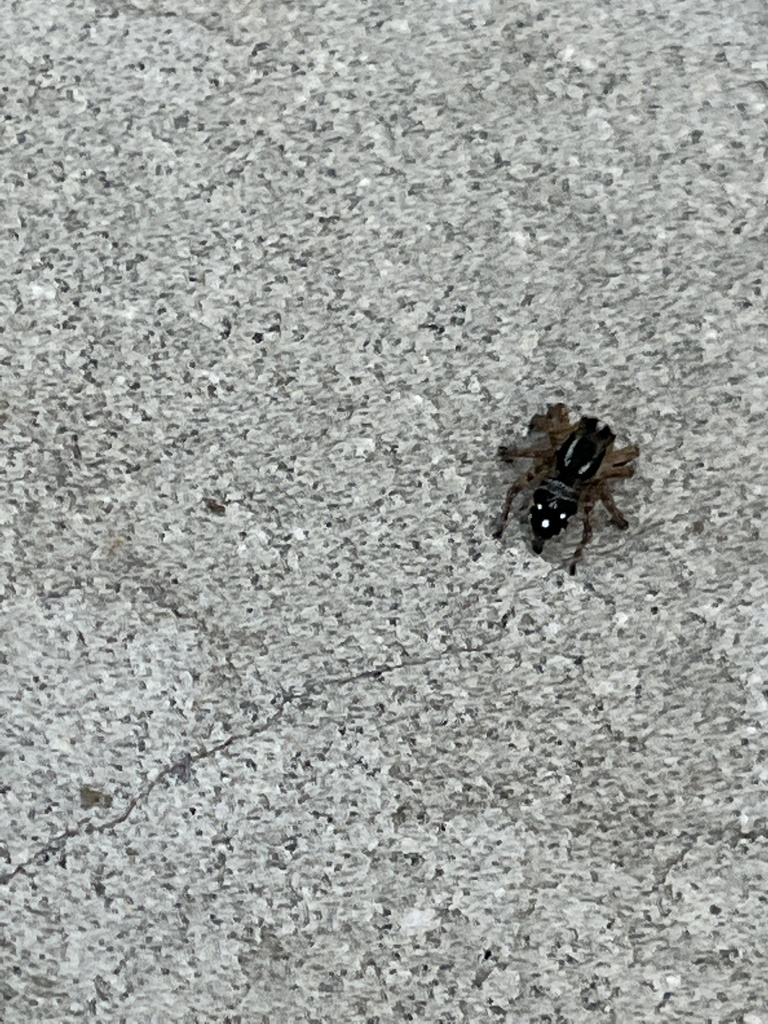
- Stenaelurillus hirsutus in Kenya

Scientific classification
- Kingdom: Animalia
- Phylum: Arthropoda
- Subphylum: Chelicerata
- Class: Arachnida
- Order: Araneae
- Infraorder: Araneomorphae
- Family: Salticidae
- Genus: Stenaelurillus
- Species: S. hirsutus

Binomial name
- Stenaelurillus hirsutus Lessert, 1927

= Stenaelurillus hirsutus =

Species of spider

Stenaelurillus hirsutus is a species of jumping spider in the genus Stenaelurillus that lives in Central, East and West Africa. Its name is a combination of a generic name is related to the Greek words for narrow and cat and a species name that is the Latin word for hairy. First found in Democratic Republic of the Congo, it lives in a wide range of environments, including hot dry places and amongst stones near rivers. The spider is typically between 4.7 and 5.2 mm (0.19 and 0.20 in) in total body length. The male is distinguished by its black and white striped pattern on the anterior of the carapace, the upper part of its forward section, and the existence of a mane of light-coloured hairs around the eye field that is reminiscent of a Mohawk hairstyle. The female's epigyne, the external visible part of its copulatory organs, has a deep narrow pocket and bean-shaped copulatory openings. The part of the male's face known as its clypeus has a distinctive pattern of three vertical white stripes on its otherwise black exterior. The species was first described in 1927 by Roger de Lessert.

== Taxonomy and etymology ==
Stenaelurillus hirsutus is a species of jumping spider, a member of the family Salticidae, that was first described in 1927 by the Swiss arachnologist, Roger de Lessert. It was placed in the genus Stenaelurillus that was first circumscribed by Eugène Simon in 1886. The genus was placed in the subtribe Aelurillina in the tribe Aelurillini by Wayne Maddison in 2015, who listed the tribe in the clade Saltafresia. Two years later, in 2017, Jerzy Prószyński grouped it with nine other genera of jumping spiders under the name Aelurillines.

The spider's generic name relates to the name of the genus Aelurillus, which itself derives from the Greek word for 'cat', with the addition of a Greek stem meaning 'narrow'. Its species name is hirsutus, the Latin word for 'hairy'. Stenaelurillus cristatus, first identified by Wanda Wesołowska and Anthony Russell-Smith in 2000, was considered a synonym for Stenaelurillus hirsutus by Wesołowska fourteen years later. The species name cristatus derives from the Latin word for 'crested'.

== Description ==
The spider's body is divided into two main parts: a more rectangular cephalothorax and a more oval abdomen that has a flat front edge. The cephalothorax measures between 2.3 and 2.7 mm (0.091 and 0.106 in) in length and between 1.5 and 1.9 mm (0.059 and 0.075 in) in width, while the abdomen is between 2.4 and 2.5 mm (0.094 and 0.098 in) long and 1.8 and 2.3 mm (0.071 and 0.091 in) wide. The male has a red-brown or dark brown carapace, the hard upper part of the cephalothorax, covered in scales, with bands of white scales crossing the back and thorax. It is described as both oval and pear-shaped. The eye field is black and has long dense fawn-coloured hairs that form a mane that produces an effect reminiscent of the Mohawk hairstyle popular in punk fashion. Similar hairs form a brush around the carapace. The sternum, the underside of the carapace, is dark brown. Its chelicerae are brown and hairy. There is a small tooth to the rear. The remainder of the spider's mouthparts, its labium and maxilae, are light brown.

The male's abdomen is dark brown with two narrow lines of white hairs at the front and three dots to the rear. Its book lung covers are yellow and its spinnerets are dark brown. Its legs are brown-yellow with a dark brown patch on the forelegs. The front legs have yellow hairs while the remainder have a covering of dark brown hairs. The spider's copulatory organs are distinctive. Its pedipalps are yellow and ends in palpal tibia that has two spikes or apophyses, one thorn-like and the other, bulge-shaped. Its palpal bulb is small and has a pointed bulge at its base that overlaps with the palpal tibia. Attached to the bulb, the cymbium is covered in dense dark brown hairs on its leading edge and white hairs on its other sides. At the end of the bulb is a short ribbon-like embolus that has a wider rounded root.

The female is slightly larger than the male, typically 0.2 mm (0.0079 in) longer. Its carapace is brown and has white scales covering two yellow stripes that stretch from front to back. It has a yellow sternum as are its cheeks and clypeus. Its chelicerae, labium and maxillae are brown-yellow. It has a dark brown abdomen with three dots and an indistinct leaf pattern marked in white on its back. The spinnerets are brown and legs yellow. The epigyne has flat plate in the middle, a deep narrow pocket and two widely separated bean-shaped copulatory openings. Short insemination ducts lead to large sac-like primary spermathecae, or receptacles.

Both the male and female spiders have strong visual similarities with some other members of the genus. The female is almost identical to Stenaelurillus pilosus, but can be identified by the elongated shape of the spermathecae. The male is very similar to Stenaelurillus glaber and Stenaelurillus striolatus. However, it can be distinguished from these species by the pattern on the male clypeus, which is black with three vertical white stripes. It is also nearly identical to Stenaelurillus bandama, so much so that its holotype was initially thought to be a Stenaelurillus hirsutus spider. The only differences in markings between the two are the vertical white stripes on the clypeus are narrower on Stenaelurillus hirsutus and its embolus is wider and is shaped differently. The shape of the embolus is also an important difference between this species and Stenaelurillus jocquei.

== Distribution and habitat ==
Although Stenaelurillus spiders live across Africa, Stenaelurillus hirsutus has been found in areas of Central, East and West Africa predominantly between 10° north and 10° south of the Equator. The species was first identified near Faradje in Democratic Republic of the Congo. It was then found across East Africa, including around Lake Baringo in the Kenyan Rift Valley, the Mkomazi National Park in Tanzania and Murchison Falls National Park In Uganda. In West Africa, it has been seen near Bambari, Central African Republic, in the West Gonja Municipal District of Ghana, Kossou in Ivory Coast and Bignona in Senegal. The species distribution also includes Kenya.

The species seems to favour hot, dry areas, finding shelter amongst shrubs and living under stones near rivers. Although many live at lower altitudes, examples have been seen at an altitude of 2,000 m (6,600 ft) above sea level on Mount Elgon.
