= Stenaelurillus glaber =

Scientific classification
- Kingdom: Animalia
- Phylum: Arthropoda
- Subphylum: Chelicerata
- Class: Arachnida
- Order: Araneae
- Infraorder: Araneomorphae
- Family: Salticidae
- Genus: Stenaelurillus
- Species: S. glaber

Binomial name
- Stenaelurillus glaber Wesołowska & A. Russell-Smith, 2011

Species of spider

Stenaelurillus glaber is a species of jumping spider in the genus Stenaelurillus that lives in Ghana, Ivory Coast, Nigeria and Uganda. It was first described in 2011 by Wanda Wesołowska and Anthony Russell-Smith. Only the male has been identified. The spider is small, with a brown cephalothorax 2.58 mm (0.102 in) in length and black abdomen between 2.05 and 2.4 mm (0.081 and 0.094 in) long. The carapace is marked with four stripes and the abdomen by three white spots. It is distinguished from other members of the genus by its clypeus, which is entirely yellow and hairy.

== Taxonomy ==
Stenaelurillus glaber was first described by Wanda Wesołowska and Anthony Russell-Smith in 2011. It is one of over 500 species identified by the Polish arachnologist Wesołowska. The genus Stenaelurillus was first raised by Eugène Simon in 1885. The name relates to the genus name Aelurillus, which itself derives from the Greek word for cat, with the addition of a Greek stem meaning narrow. In 2017, it was grouped with nine other genera of jumping spiders under the name Aelurillines. It has been placed in the subtribe Aelurillina in the tribe Aelurillini in the clade Saltafresia. The species name recalls the lack of any hairs or brushes on the carapace.

== Description ==
Only the male has been described. The spider is small, with a cephalothorax that measures 2.58 mm (0.102 in) in length and 1.8 mm (0.071 in) in width. It has a dark brown pear-shaped carapace with four stripes, two more pronounced on the main body and two others on the edges. The abdomen is dark brown and has three large white spots on its rear half. It ranges from 2.05 and 2.4 mm (0.081 and 0.094 in) long and is 1.4 mm (0.055 in) wide. The eye field is black and has bristles, some of which are white. while the legs are yellow. The pedipalps are also yellow, but have numerous bristles on them, unlike Stenaelurillus pilosus. The palpal bulb is similar to Stenaelurillus hirsutus, Stenaelurillus pilosus and Stenaelurillus striolatus. It can be distinguished from these species by the fact that the clypeus is yellow with white hairs. .

== Distribution and habitat ==
The species was first identified in Nigeria. The holotype for the species was found in Kwara State in 1973. It was found in cultivated savanna. It was subsequently observed near Aburi, Ghana, and Pakwach, Uganda. A further example was identified, a specimen collected in 1975, from Mount Niangbo in Ivory Coast. The distribution now includes all four countries.
