= Pulmonate (disambiguation) =

Pulmonate may refer to

- Having lungs; in particular
  - Pulmonata, gastropods which breathe through pallial lungs
  - Pulmonate arthropods, which breathe through book lungs
