= Pedipalp (disambiguation) =

A pedipalp is a type of mouthpart among arachnids. Palpi or pedipalpi can refer to:

- Pedipalpi, a subclade of Tetrapulmonata
- Palpi (Lepidoptera mouthpart)
- Pedipalp (Dungeons & Dragons)
