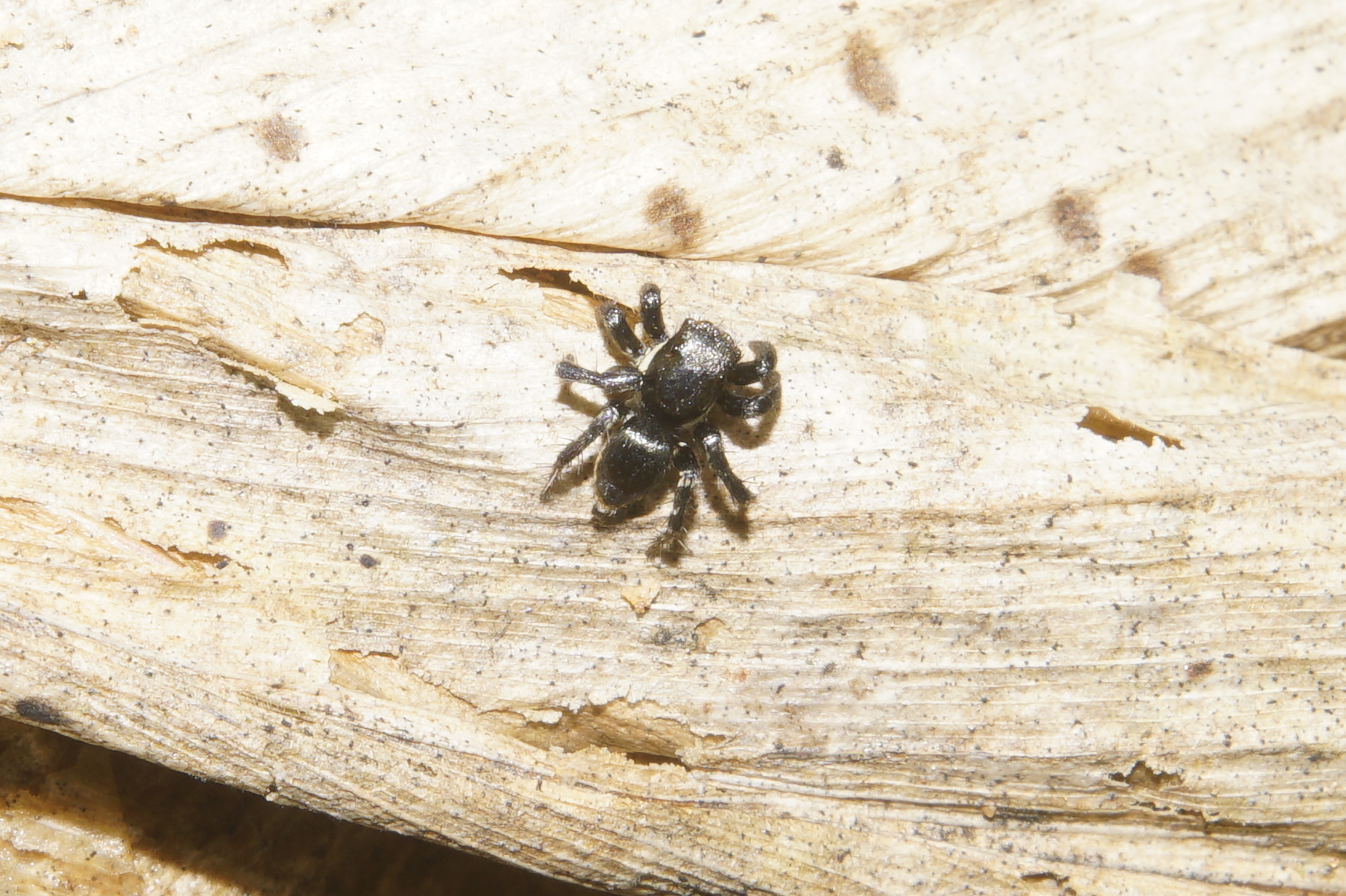
- A spider of the Stenaelurillus genus

Scientific classification
- Kingdom: Animalia
- Phylum: Arthropoda
- Subphylum: Chelicerata
- Class: Arachnida
- Order: Araneae
- Infraorder: Araneomorphae
- Family: Salticidae
- Genus: Stenaelurillus
- Species: S. jocquei

Binomial name
- Stenaelurillus jocquei Logunov & Azarkina, 2018

= Stenaelurillus jocquei =

Species of spider

Stenaelurillus jocquei is a species of jumping spider in the genus Stenaelurillus that lives in Cameroon. It was first described in 2018 by Dmitri Logunov and Galina Azarkina. The spider is medium-sized, with a carapace between 2.6 and 2.7 mm (0.10 and 0.11 in) long and abdomen between 12.4 and 3.5 mm (0.49 and 0.14 in) long. The female is slightly larger than the male. The colouration differs between examples, which have been termed the light form and dark form. The carapace is brown and has two white stripes and the abdomen is brown with three white spots and three white stripes, the abdomen being darker in the dark form. The clypeus is yellowish brown in the light form and brown in the dark form. The male light form has iridenscent hairs on the clypeus and its brown eye field. The spinnerets of the female light form are yellow, the male brown and the dark form darker still. The species can be best distinguished from the similar Stenaelurillus hirsutus by its copulatory organs. The male has a ribbon-like spiralling embolus and the female has large round spermathecae.

== Taxonomy ==
Stenaelurillus jocquei was first described by Dmitri Logunov and Galina Azarkina in 2018. It was placed in the genus Stenaelurillus, first raised by Eugène Simon in 1886. The genus name relates to the genus name Aelurillus, which itself derives from the Greek word for cat, with the addition of a Greek stem meaning narrow. It was placed in the subtribe Aelurillina in the tribe Aelurillini by Wayne Maddison in 2015, who listed the tribe in the clade Saltafresia. Two years later, in 2017, it was grouped with nine other genera of jumping spiders under the name Aelurillines. The species is named after Rudy Jocqué, the collector of the type series.

== Description ==
The spider is medium-sized and appears in two forms, which have identical copulatory organs but different colouration. These are termed the light form and dark form.

The male of the light form has a brown carapace that measures 2.7 mm (0.11 in) in length and 1.9 mm (0.075 in) in width. It is covered in dark brown scales and has two wide stripes made of white scales, along with edging also of white scales. The abdomen is brown, 2.4 mm (0.094 in) long and 1.75 mm (0.069 in) wide, and has a pattern consisting of three white spots and three white stripes. The eye field is dark brown and is decorated with long brown iridescent hairs. The chelicerae is yellow with brown hairs and the clypeus is yellowish brown with yellow hairs, also iridescent. The spinnerets are brown, the legs are brown and yellow and the pedipalps are yellow. The palpal bulb is shaped like a bulge and has distinctive appendages. The embolus is long, spiralled and ribbon-like.

The light form female is similar to the male in shape but overall slightly larger. The carapace the same length but 2.2 mm (0.087 in) wide and the abdomen has a length of between 3.0 and 3.5 in (76 and 89 mm) and width of between 2.25 and 2.8 mm (0.089 and 0.110 in). The colouring is similar to the male but lighter, and the iridescent hairs are lacking. The spinnerets and legs are all yellow, while the pedipalps are yellow with brown bristles. The epigyne is flat and has a deep narrow pocket. The copulatory openings are large and has a heavily sclerotized rim. It has short and wide insemination ducts and large round spermathecae.

The dark form differs in that it has a slightly shorter carapace 2.6 mm (0.10 in) long and has a darker abdomen that is 2.5 mm (0.098 in) long and 1.7 mm (0.067 in) wide. The chelicerae and clypeus are brown and covered with very dark brown hairs. The pedipalps and spinnerets are also darker brown and the legs darker too. The spider is very similar to Stenaelurillus hirsutus, although it has two rather than three stripes. The longer spiralling embolus is a distinguishing feature of the male, while the way that the pocket in the epigyne of the female sits between the copulatory openings and the round, rather than elongated spermathecae, differentiate the female.

== Distribution ==
The species is endemic to Cameroon. The holotype was identified based on a specimen collected in a gallery forest in the Faro Game Reserve in 2007. It has also been found in nearby savanna.
