= List of extinct arachnids =

This article contains a list of extinct species from the class Arachnida, with the year and location that they were last recorded.

== Extinct ==
Scientific name	Common name	Year last seen	Last known location
Centrobunus braueri	N/A	1894	Mahé, Seychelles
Dicrogonatus gardineri	N/A	1909	Mahé, Seychelles
Halarachne americana	Caribbean monk seal nasal mite	1952	Caribbean Sea
Hirstienus nanus	N/A	1908	Mahé, Seychelles
Metazalmoxis ferruginea	N/A	1892	Mahé, Seychelles
Peromona erinacea	N/A	1892	Mahé, Seychelles
Pleorotus braueri	N/A	1894	Mahé, Seychelles
Sitalcicus gardineri	N/A	1908	Mahé, Seychelles
Stipax triangulifer	N/A	1894	Mahé, Seychelles
Thomasettia seychellana	N/A	1908	Mahé, Seychelles and Silhouette Island
Diplaegidia gladiator	Passenger pigeon mite	1914	North America

== Extinct in the wild ==
There are currently no known arachnids that are extinct in the wild yet still kept in captivity.

== See also ==
- Endangered spiders
