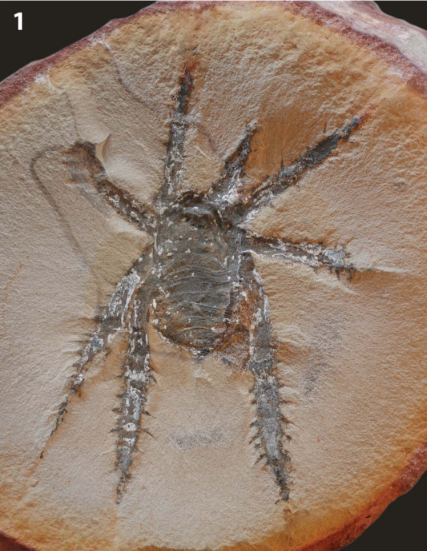
- Holotype specimen

Scientific classification
- Kingdom: Animalia
- Phylum: Arthropoda
- Subphylum: Chelicerata
- Class: Arachnida
- Clade: Pantetrapulmonata
- Genus: †Douglassarachne; Selden and Dunlop, 2024
- Species: †D. acanthopoda

Binomial name
- †Douglassarachne acanthopoda Selden and Dunlop, 2024

= Douglassarachne =

Douglassarachne Temporal range: Moscovian

Extinct species of arachnid

Douglassarachne is an extinct genus of arachnid from the Late Carboniferous (Moscovian) with only one known species, D. acanthopoda. It is known exclusively from one specimen recovered from the Mazon Creek Lagerstätte.

This arachnid is characterized by having large spines on its legs. It is unknown which order this arachnid belongs to.

== Etymology ==
The genus is named for the Douglass family who donated the specimen to the Field Museum of Natural History for study.

== History ==
In 1980, the only known fossil of Douglassarachne was discovered by Bob Masek. It was found in the Mazon Creek fossil beds, which preserves fossils from around 308 million years ago; it was specifically found in the Pit 15 Northern Mine spoil heap. It was preserved in a siderite concretion. Around 1990, Masek sold it to David Douglass.

It was displayed in the Douglass family's Prehistoric Life Museum. In 2023, when it became apparent that this specimen represented a new species, David Douglass donated the specimen to the Field Museum of Natural History so it could be researched.

The specimen is deposited in the collections of the Field Museum of Natural History with the number PE 91366.

== Morphology ==
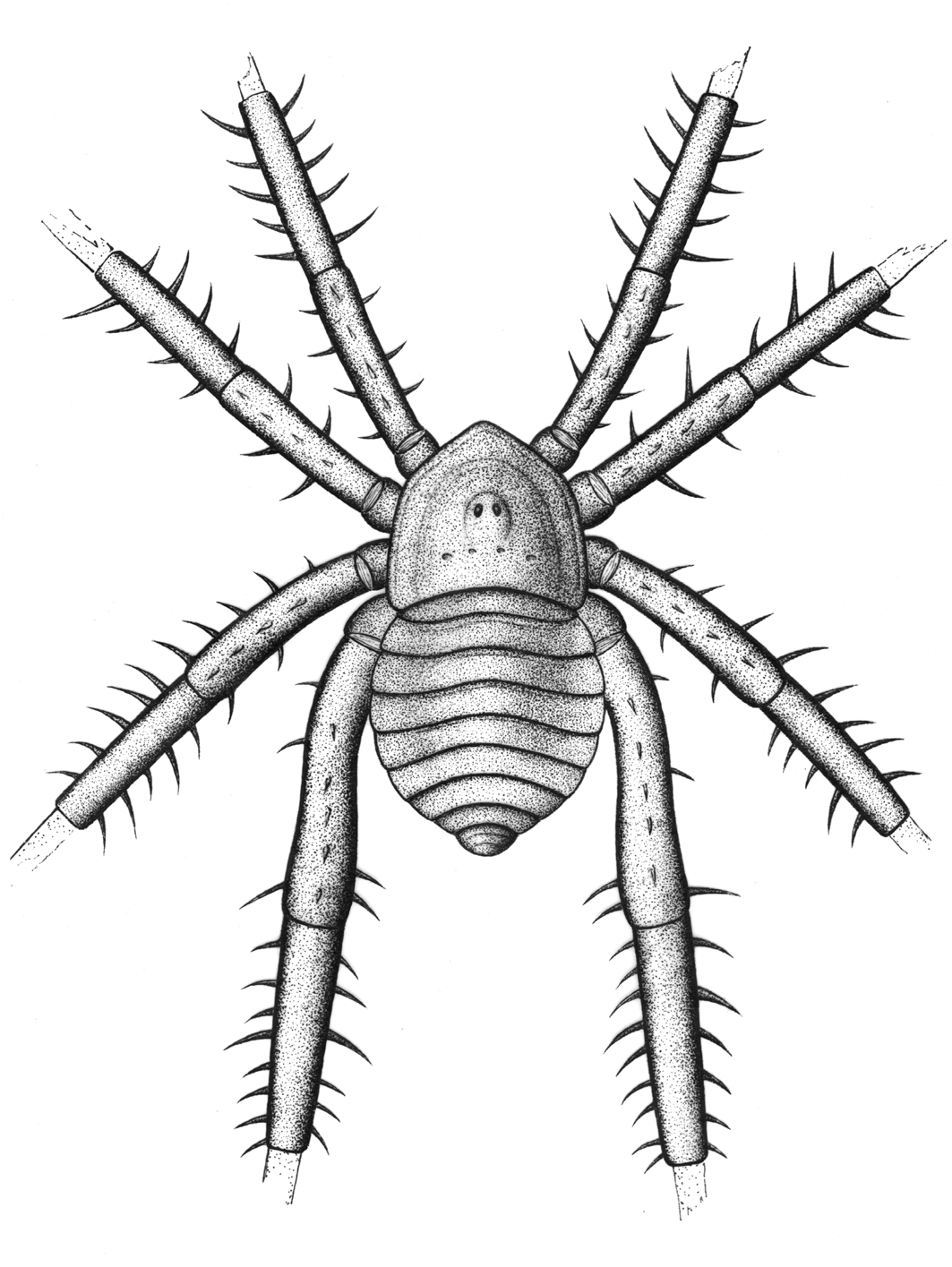
Reconstruction

Douglassarachne is characterized by four pairs of legs and a body approximately 15 mm (0.59 in) long. The body is divided into an anterior prosoma and a posterior segmented opisthosoma. The prosoma is shielded by a subtriangular, undivided carapace with a slight anterior projection. Chelicerae and pedipalps are not preserved in the fossil record, suggesting they were either very small or lost during preservation. The legs are robust, with the fourth set slightly thicker than the others. Each leg had large curved spines on the proximal articles. The opisthosoma is broadly attached to the prosoma, with at least eight visible tergites without ornamentation. The posterior segments form a small anal tubercle, though the total number of segments is unclear.

== Classification ==
The morphology of Douglassarachne does not align with any known arachnid orders. With similarly spiny legs, it superficially resembles certain harvestmen (such as Podoctidae and Lacinius). Overall morphology is also somewhat reminiscent of a mite within order Opilioacarida. However, notable differences in leg structure, body segmentation, and size preclude definitive classification with these groups. It also shares some characteristics with the Pantetrapulmonata lineage, including a distinct coupling between the prosoma and opisthosoma and a series of undifferentiated opisthosomal tergites. However, the absence of preserved chelicerae frustrates confirmation of this classification. As such, it is referred to as Arachnida/Pantetrapulmonata incertae sedis due to the lack of definitive apomorphic characters.

== Paleoecology ==
Its spiny legs, like some of modern harvestmen, suggests that it used spines for protection from predators. There are multiple taxa from the Late Carboniferous with similarly developed spines (such as trigonotarbid Eophrynus or millipedes Euphoberia and Myriacantherpestes), which possibly reflects the evolution of their predators.
