= Xenarachne =

Xenarachne Temporal range: Lower Devonian (Emsian)

Scientific classification
- Kingdom: Animalia
- Phylum: Arthropoda
- Subphylum: Chelicerata
- Class: Arachnida
- Clade: Tetrapulmonata
- Genus: †Xenarachne; Dunlop & Poschmann, 1997

Type species
- †Xenarachne willwerathensis Dunlop & Poschmann, 1997

Extinct genus of arachnids

Xenarachne is an enigmatic extinct genus of arachnid that lived in Germany during the Emsian stage of the lower Devonian period. This genus contains one species, Xenarachne willwerathensis. It was named by Dunlop & Poschmann in 1997.

== Taxonomy ==
While it was placed into Tetrapulmonata (a clade of arachnids including spiders), its taxonomic placement is unknown making it an enigmatic taxon. While it has some similarities with the whip spiders (Amblypygi), it could also represent a genus of very early spider.
