= List of endangered spiders =

An endangered species is "a species at risk of extinction because of human activity, changes in climate, changes in predator-prey ratios, etc., especially when officially designated as such by a governmental agency such as the U.S. Fish and Wildlife Service". A spider is a member of the order Araneae, one of many orders within the class arachnida, meaning it has a body consisting of two segments, a cephalothorax and an abdomen, as well as eight legs. All spiders are predators that feed off insects, and some larger species have been known to catch small reptiles, birds, and amphibians (Levi and Levi, 2002). Until recently, insects and arachnids have not been considered for inclusion on threatened and endangered species lists. It was not until 1994 that most invertebrates were recognized as being as vulnerable as other fauna. Because of this, there are very few species of spiders listed as threatened or endangered and many are simply classified as "undetermined".

== Endangered species ==
While many organizations agree completely on which spiders are endangered or threatened, a few commonly listed species are listed below.

=== Spruce-fir moss spider (Microhexura montivaga) ===
The spruce-fir moss spider is listed as endangered under the U.S. Endangered Species Act of 1973. This spider resembles a tiny tarantula with adults measuring in at only 14.3 to 3.8 millimeters. It inhabits high-elevation forests in western North Carolina and eastern Tennessee. The species is extremely vulnerable to desiccation, causing it to shelter in damp shady areas such as shaded moss. The spider builds a tube shaped web between the moss and a rock or fir tree, hence the name.

=== Kauaʻi cave wolf spider (Adelocosa anops) ===
The Kauaʻi cave wolf spider is found only on the island of Kauai in the U.S. state of Hawaii. As of 2006, this species can be found in a single cave and only 16 to 28 individuals have been encountered. Compared to other spider species, the Kauaʻi cave wolf spider has a low reproductive rate and due to habitat constraints, has little access to food sources. This spider is one of the largest documented cave-dwelling organisms measuring up to 8 centimeters. Because it spends its life in the darkness of a cave, this spider has no need for sight and is therefore completely eyeless.

=== Katipō (Latrodectus katipo) ===
The katipō spider is related to the Australian redback and other widow spiders. This spider can be found in New Zealand in burrows or trees. The name means "night-stinger" in native Māori language. This species is listed as endangered due to habitat loss, as well as non-native spider introduction. It is estimated that only a few thousand of these spiders remain in the wild.

== Vulnerable species ==
A vulnerable species is one listed by the International Union for Conservation of Nature as likely to become endangered unless the circumstances threatening its survival and reproduction improve.

=== Dolloff cave spider (Meta dolloff) ===
While not listed as endangered, this spider is considered to be vulnerable to extinction. Much larger than Microhexura montivaga, this spider ranges in size from 10 to 15 millimeters. This species makes large orb shaped webs at the entrance of caves and as of 2001 has only been found in caves located in Santa Cruz, California.

=== Great raft spider (Dolomedes plantarius) ===
The great raft spider is a declining species and is listed as vulnerable. It occurs throughout Europe but a lack of records make assessment of the species difficult. In the UK there are only three known populations, one stable, one threatened and one not assessed. This spider is a semi-aquatic species and its dependence on water may have led to the population's decline. The information on the great raft spider is very recent and due to a lack of historical records, the level of decline cannot be accurately measured.

== See also ==
- Endangered arthropods
- List of U.S. federally endangered arthropods
- List of extinct arachnids
