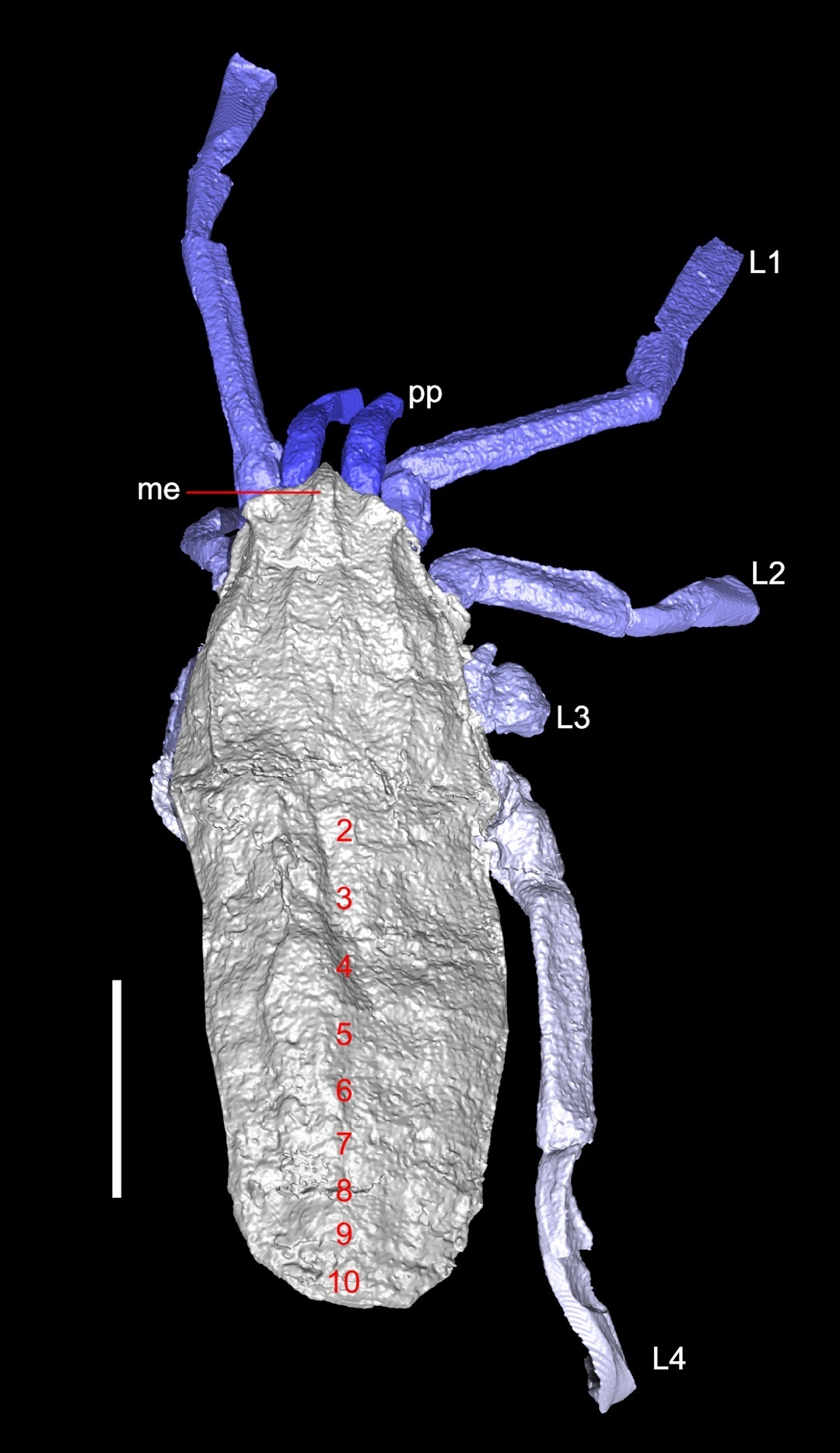
- CT scan
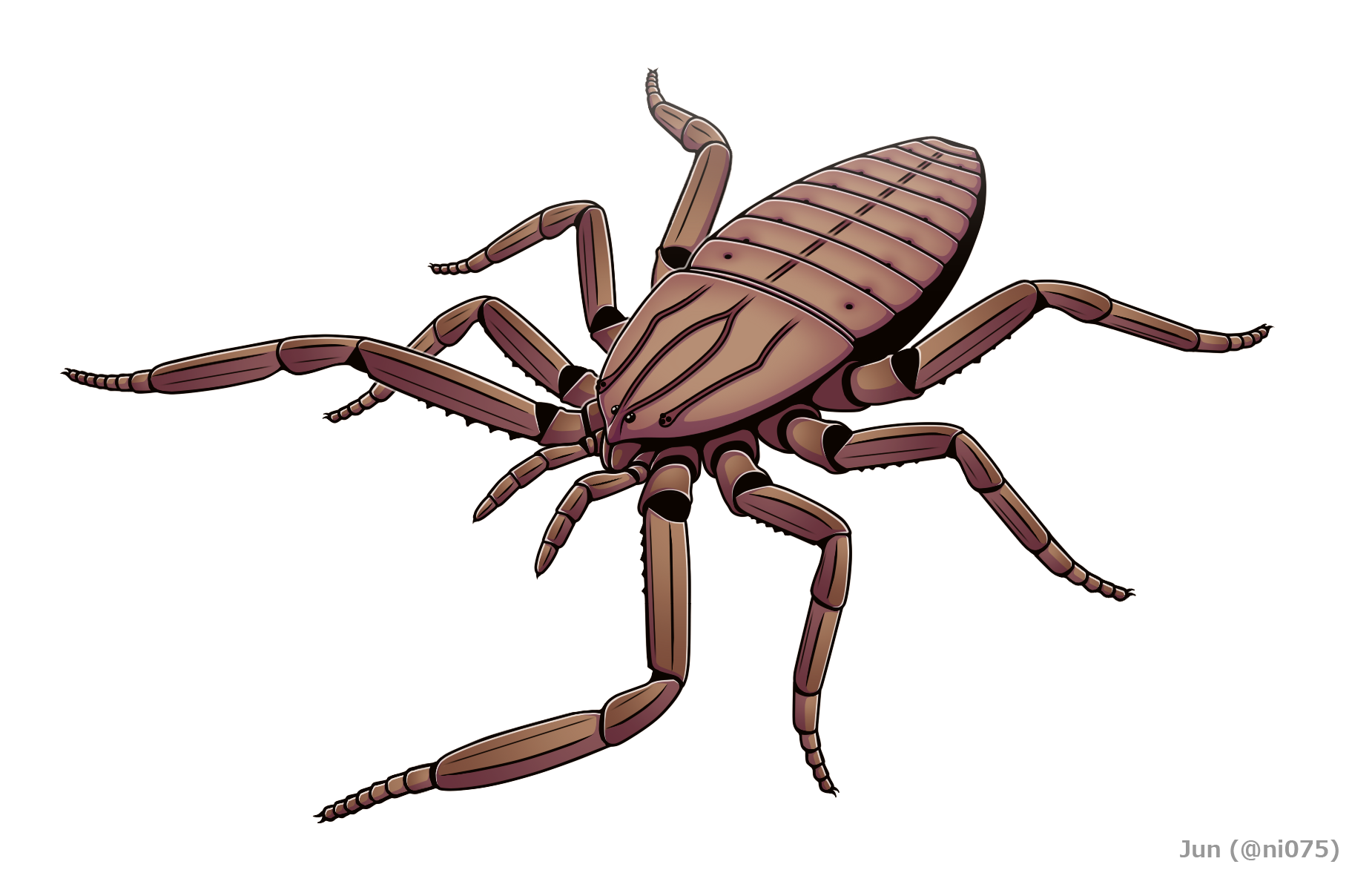
- Life restoration

Scientific classification
- Kingdom: Animalia
- Phylum: Arthropoda
- Subphylum: Chelicerata
- Class: Arachnida
- Clade: Tetrapulmonata
- Order: †Haptopoda; Pocock, 1911
- Genus: †Plesiosiro; Pocock, 1911
- Species: †P. madeleyi

Binomial name
- †Plesiosiro madeleyi Pocock, 1911

= Plesiosiro =

Plesiosiro Temporal range: Upper Carboniferous

Extinct genus of arachnids

Plesiosiro is an extinct arachnid genus known exclusively from nine specimens from the Upper Carboniferous of Coseley, West Midlands, United Kingdom. The genus is monotypic, represented only by the species Plesiosiro madeleyi described by Reginald Innes Pocock in his important 1911 monograph on British Carboniferous arachnids. It is the only known member of the order Haptopoda.

The original fossils have been redescribed in detail by Alexander Petrunkevitch in 1949 and Dunlop in 1999. A supposed example from the Coal Measures of Lancashire is a misidentification.

== Relationships ==
Plesiosiro means "close to Siro", which is a genus of cyphophthalmid (Cyphophthalmi); the most primitive group of the living harvestmen (Opiliones). These harvestmen do, in some ways, resemble the reconstructed body plan of the haptopods.

Revisions have confirmed that Haptopoda should be treated as a separate and independent order. A 2007 study tentatively recognised a group named Schizotarsata Shultz, 2007 comprising Haptopoda, Amblypygi (whip spiders), Uropygi (whip scorpions) and Schizomida (schizomids), which has been recovered subsequently in a number of other phylogenies to include fossils. All share the character of a subdivided tarsus (or foot) which gives the group its name. A 2014 analysis found that Plesiosiro had chelicerae consisting of two elements, a basal paturon and a fang, which suggests a position within Tetrapulmonata. Under both equal and implied weights, Plesisiro was found to be the most basal member of a clade containing Amblypygi, Schizomida, and Uropygi (Thelyphonida s.s.), which was sister to the clade containing Araneae and Uraraneida.

Cladogram of Tetrapulmonata after Dunlop 2022.

- Tetrapulmonata
  - Shizotarsata
    - †Haptopoda (Plesiosiro)
    - Pedipalpi
      - Amblypygi (whip spiders)
      - - Uropygi (whip scorpions/vinegaroons)
        - Schizomida (short-tailed whip-scorpions)
  - Serikodiastida
    - †Uraraneida
    - Araneida
      - †Chimerarachne
      - Araneae (living spiders)

== Names ==
The order has also been called Haptopodida; the ending -ida originated when Petrunkevitch (1955) tried to standardize the endings of the arachnid orders.

Haptopoda originates from Greek "haptos" (= tangible, subject to the sense of touch) + "pous, podos" (= foot) and refers to its quite long front pair of legs with their subdivided tips which look as though they might have been used to 'feel' their way around in front of the animal.
