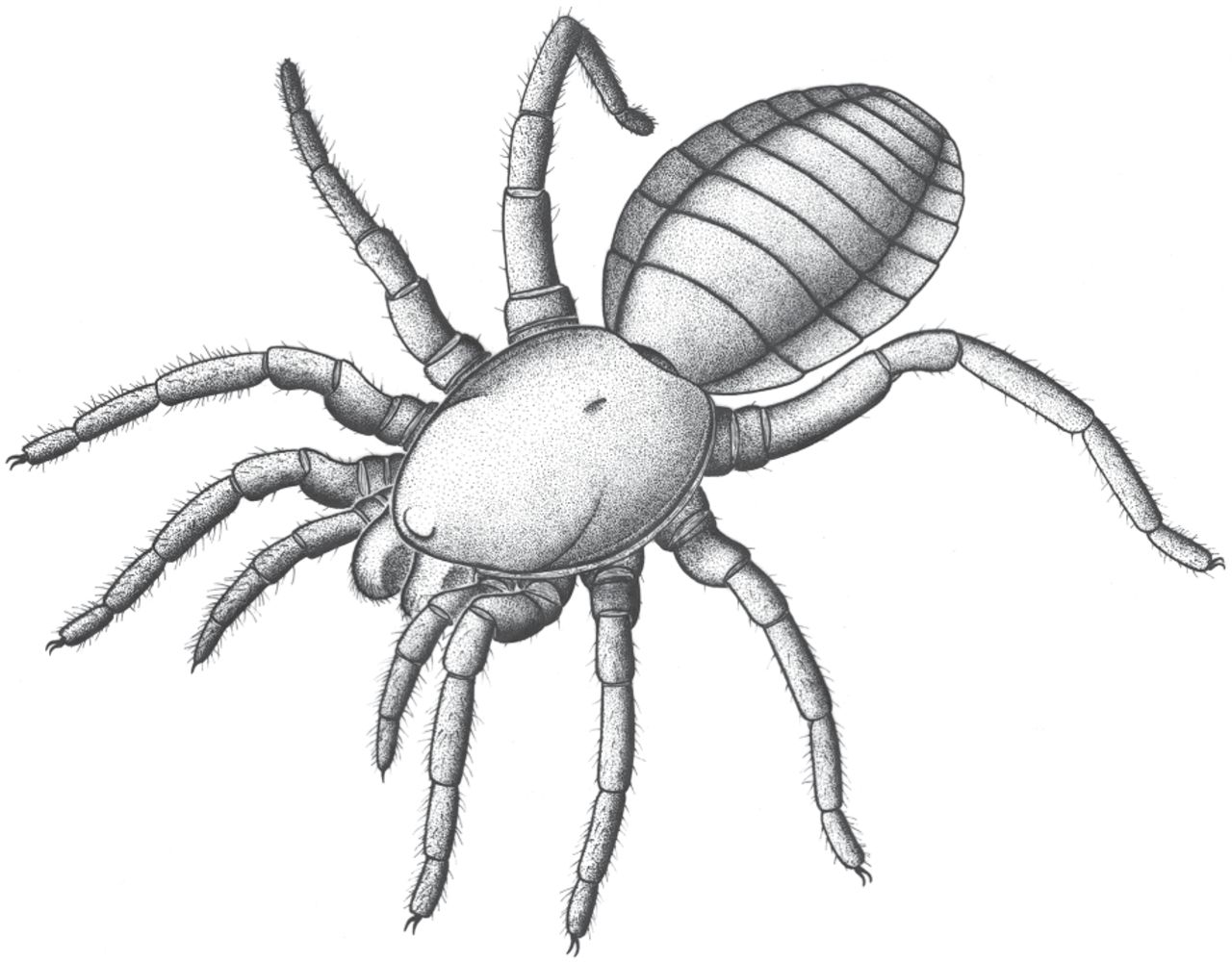
- Reconstruction of Idmonarachne brasieri

Scientific classification
- Kingdom: Animalia
- Phylum: Arthropoda
- Subphylum: Chelicerata
- Class: Arachnida
- Clade: Tetrapulmonata
- Genus: †Idmonarachne; Garwood et al., 2016
- Species: †I. brasieri

Binomial name
- †Idmonarachne brasieri Garwood et al., 2016

= Idmonarachne =

Idmonarachne Temporal range: Stephanian

Extinct genus of arachnids

Idmonarachne is an extinct genus of arachnids, containing one species, Idmonarachne brasieri. It is related to uraraneids and spiders.

== Fossil ==
A fossil assigned to this genus was found at Montceau-les-Mines, France, in ironstone concretion deposits of Late Carboniferous (Stephanian) age, about 305–299 million years old. Montceau fossils are generally preserved in such a way that fine details can be observed and three-dimensional analysis is possible. In the case of Idmonarachne, computerized tomography was used to construct a "virtual fossil".

== Description ==
The total body length of the fossil is around 10.5 mm, with the preserved part of the carapace of the cephalothorax about five mm long and the opisthosoma (abdomen) about six mm long. The eight walking legs are more-or-less uniform in appearance, with the fourth leg longest at about 8.5 mm and the first shortest at about 6.5 mm. The legs terminate in at least two claws. The two pedipalps are slightly shorter than the legs, at just under four mm long. The chelicerae are shaped like a clasp-knife, i.e. with the fang at the end folding back into the part to which it is attached. The opisthosoma shows at least seven sections on the upper surface (tergites), each with a flattened W-shaped profile composed of a wider upwardly curved central plate and two side plates. The lower surface of the opisthosoma bears eight visible plates. No spinnerets, telson or terminal spike (flagellum) are present.

== Taxonomy ==
The fossil was placed in a new genus, Idmonarachne, as the species I. brasieri. The genus name is based on the Arachne myth in which Idmon is her father, and is intended to show the position of the genus as a close relative of spiders. The species name honours Martin David Brasier for his contributions to the study of ancient life. The authors did not place the genus in a family or order.

=== Phylogeny ===
Based on its overall morphology, Idmonarachne was considered to belong to the Serikodiastida, a clade of tetrapulmonate arachnids capable of making and using silk, although the presence of silk-producing spigots was not demonstrated. Like uraraneids, it lacked spinnerets, but it did not have a flagellum, thus resembling spiders. A cladogram placed Idmonarachne between uraraenids and spiders:

- Serikodiastida
  - †Uraraneida
  - - †Idmonarachne
    - Araneae (spiders)

The Late Carboniferous appears to be a time when there was a greater diversity of tetrapulmonate arachnids.
