= Stenaelurillus striolatus =

Scientific classification
- Kingdom: Animalia
- Phylum: Arthropoda
- Subphylum: Chelicerata
- Class: Arachnida
- Order: Araneae
- Infraorder: Araneomorphae
- Family: Salticidae
- Genus: Stenaelurillus
- Species: S. striolatus

Binomial name
- Stenaelurillus striolatus Wesołowska & A. Russell-Smith, 2011

Species of spider

Stenaelurillus striolatus is a species of jumping spider in the genus Stenaelurillus that is endemic to Nigeria. It was first described in 2011 by Wanda Wesołowska and Anthony Russell-Smith. Only the male has been identified. The spider is small, with a brown cephalothorax 2.5 mm (0.098 in) in length and black abdomen 2.4 mm (0.094 in) in length. The abdomen is marked with two shining white stripes which give the species its name. It is distinguished from other members of the genus by its clypeus, which is entirely dark brown and black.

== Taxonomy ==
Stenaelurillus striolatus was first described by Wanda Wesołowska and Anthony Russell-Smith in 2011. It is one of over 500 species identified by the Polish arachnologist Wesołowska. The genus Stenaelurillus was first raised by Eugène Simon in 1886. The name relates to the genus name Aelurillus, which itself derives from the Greek word for cat, with the addition of a Greek stem meaning narrow. In 2015, Wayne Maddison placed it in the subtribe Aelurillina within the tribe Aelurillini, which is itself in the clade Saltafresia. It was subsequently grouped with nine other genera of jumping spiders under the name Aelurillines two years later in 2017. The species name relates to the shining stripes that mark the abdomen.

== Description ==
Only the male has been described. The spider is small, with a cephalothorax that measures 2.5 mm (0.098 in) in length and 1.8 mm (0.071 in) in width. It has a brown pear-shaped carapace with two stripes formed by white hairs. The abdomen is narrower than other species in the genus, and is black with three distinctive shining stripes. The shape of the abdomen differs from other species of Stenaelurillus, which are typically oblong. It is 2.4 mm (0.094 in) long and 1.5 mm (0.059 in) wide. The eye field is black, while the legs are yellow, as are the pedipalps. The palpal bulb is similar to Stenaelurillus glaber, Stenaelurillus hirsutus and Stenaelurillus pilosus. It can be distinguished from these species by the fact that the clypeus is entirely dark brown and black. .

== Distribution and habitat ==
The species is endemic to Nigeria. The holotype for the species was found in the Borgu Game Reserve in Kwara State in 1973. It was found in cultivated savanna.
