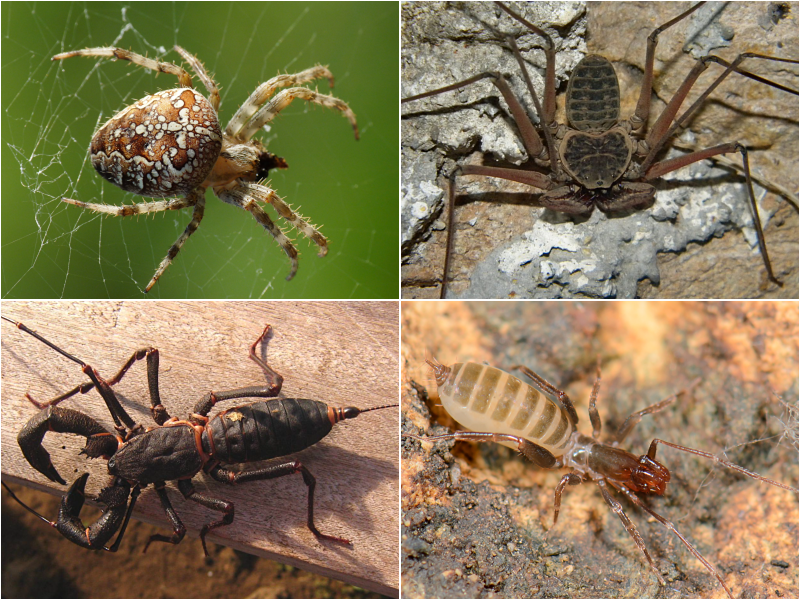
- Clockwise from top left: Araneus diadematus (Araneae) Phrynus (Amblypygi) Hubbardia briggsi (Schizomida) Mastigoproctus scabrosus (Uropygi)

Scientific classification
- Kingdom: Animalia
- Phylum: Arthropoda
- Subphylum: Chelicerata
- Class: Arachnida
- Clade: Arachnopulmonata
- Clade: Pantetrapulmonata
- Clade: Tetrapulmonata; Shultz, 1990

Orders
- Schizotarsata; †Haptopoda (extinct); Pedipalpi; Amblypygi – whip spiders; Schizomida – short-tailed whipscorpions; Uropygi – whip scorpions, vinegaroons; †Xenarachne; Serikodiastida; †Uraraneida (extinct); †Idmonarachne; Araneida; †Chimerarachnida; Araneae – spiders

= Tetrapulmonata =

Tetrapulmonata Temporal range: Devonian–Holocene

Clade of arachnids

Tetrapulmonata is a non-ranked supra-ordinal clade of arachnids. It is composed of the extant orders Uropygi (whip scorpions), Schizomida (short-tailed whip scorpions), Amblypygi (tail-less whip scorpions) and Araneae (spiders). It is the only supra-ordinal group of arachnids that is strongly supported in molecular phylogenetic studies. Two extinct orders are also placed in this clade, Haptopoda and Uraraneida. In 2016, a newly described fossil arachnid, Idmonarachne, was also included in the Tetrapulmonata; as of March 2016 it has not been assigned to an order.

== Etymology ==
It receives its name from the presence of paired book lungs occupying the second and third opisthosomal segments, although the posterior pair is absent in Schizomida and most araneomorph spiders. Previous synonyms of this lineage are rejected; "Caulogastra Pocock, 1893" refers to pedicel, which is symplesiomorphic for the lineage and convergent with Solifugae, and "Arachnidea Van der Hammen, 1977" is easily confused with Arachnida. The clade is referred to as Pantetrapulmonata when the extinct trigonotarbid arachnids are included.

The name "Pulmonata" has been used for this group as recently as 2000, in the first paragraph of an article in Journal of Paleontology, but this creates ambiguity because Pulmonata is a group of gastropods.

== Characteristics ==
In addition to the two pairs of book lungs, other synapomorphies of Tetrapulmonata include a large postcerebral pharynx (reduced in Uropygi), prosomal endosternite with four segmental components, subchelate chelicerae, a complex coxotrochanteral joint in the walking legs, a pretarsal depressor muscle arising in the patella (convergent with Dromopoda, lost in Amblypygi), a pedicel formed, in part, by ventral elements of the second opisthomal segment and a spermatozoon axoneme with a 9+3 microtubule arrangement.

== Phylogeny ==
A cladogram published in 2014 divides the Tetrapulmonata into two clades, the Schizotarsata and the Serikodiastida. The Schizotarsata have walking legs II–IV with the tarsus having a specific pattern of three subsegments (tarsomeres). The Serikodiastida (Greek for "silk workers") share the ability to produce and use silk. The sister clade to Tetrapulmonata is the extinct order Trigonotarbida; together they form a clade that has been called "Pantetrapulmonata", to which the Carboniferous genus Douglassarachne was also referred in 2024.

- Pantetrapulmonata
  - †Trigonotarbida
  - Tetrapulmonata
    - Schizotarsata
      - †Haptopoda
      - Pedipalpi
        - Thelyphonida s.l. Uropygi s.l.
          - Uropygi s.s.
          - Schizomida
        - Amblypygi
    - Serikodiastida
      - †Uraraneida
      - Araneae

In 2016, a fossil arachnid from the Late Carboniferous (Pennsylvanian) age was described in the genus Idmonarachne. Based on its overall morphology, it was considered to belong to the Serikodiastida, although the presence of silk-producing spigots was not demonstrated. Like uraraneids, it lacked spinnerets, but it also lacked a flagellum, thus resembling spiders. A cladogram based on morphology placed Idmonarachne between uraraneids and spiders:

- Serikodiastida
  - †Uraraneida
  - - †Idmonarachne
    - Araneae

The Late Carboniferous appears to be a time when there was a greater diversity of tetrapulmonate arachnids.

== Sources ==
Jeffrey W. Shultz. 2007. "A phylogenetic analysis of the arachnid orders based on morphological characters". Zoological Journal of the Linnean Society 150(?):221-265. (See External links below).
