= Book lung =

Type of lung commonly found in arachnids

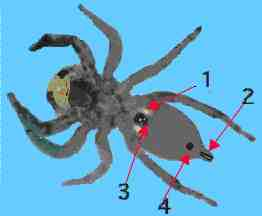
In this spider diagram, the position of the book lungs is labelled 1.

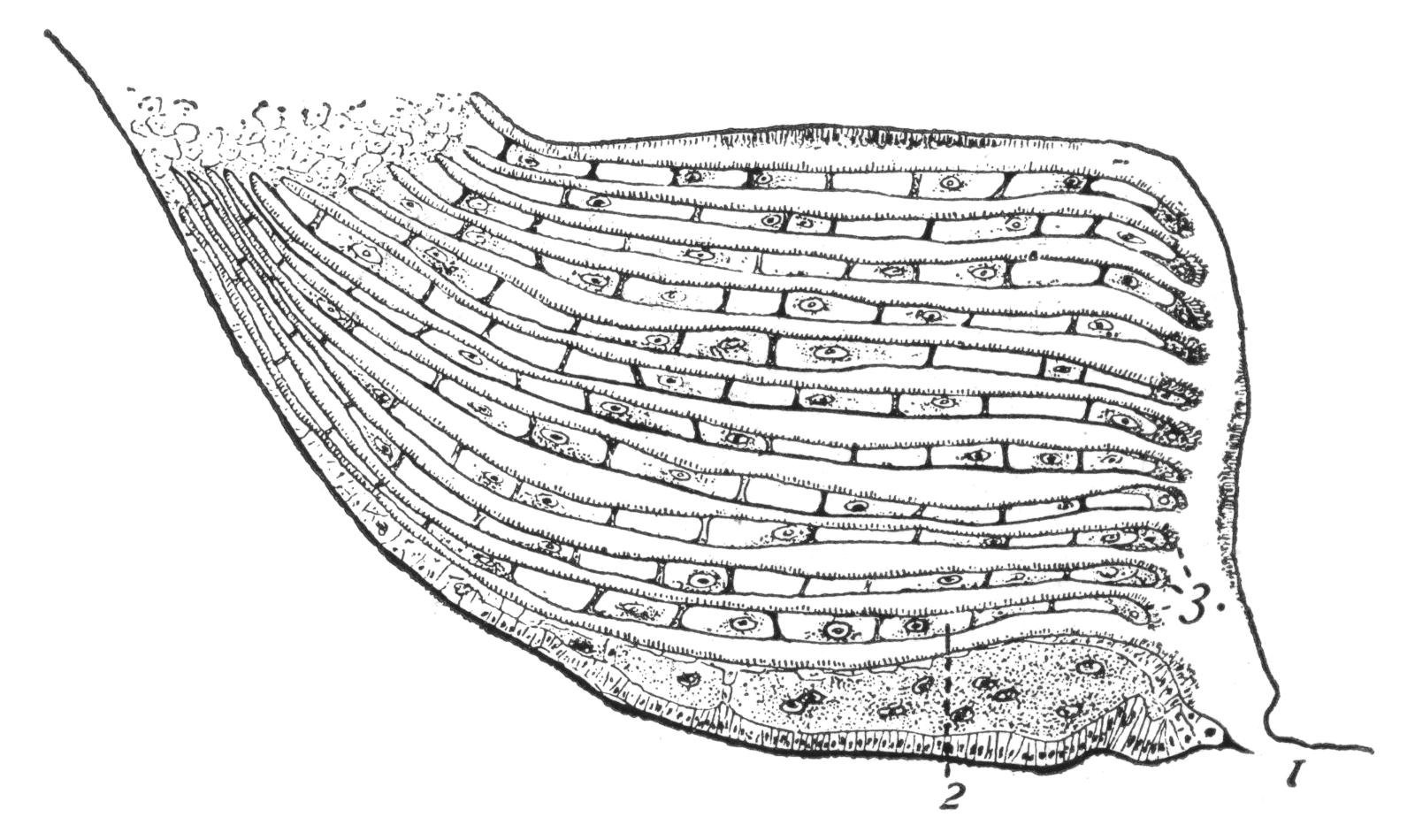
Spider book lungs (cross section)

Internal anatomy of a female spider, book lungs shown in pink

A book lung is a type of respiration organ used for atmospheric gas exchange present in some arachnids such as scorpions and tetrapulmonates (spiders and whip scorpions). It is a terrestrial adaptation of the book gills seen in aquatic chelicerates such as horseshoe crabs, where the gills are ventral appendages under the abdomen (opisthosoma) arranged into a series of page-like lamellae in order to maximize surface area for diffusion. In arachnids, each of these organs is housed inside an air-filled cavity (atrium) that opens to the surrounding atmosphere through a small opening (spiracle), which provides a controlled environment for respiration.

== Structure and function ==
Book lungs are not related to the balloon-like lungs of terrestrial vertebrates (tetrapods), the latter not evolved from any gills but rather a homolog of swim bladders. The name "lung" instead merely describes the structure's function as an aerial respiratory organ, which is a case of convergent evolution producing an analog of vertebrate lungs. Stacks of alternating air pockets and lamellar tissue filled with hemolymph (Note: Hemolymph is the arthropod equivalent of blood.) give them an appearance similar to a "folded" book.

The number of book lungs varies from just one pair in most spiders to four pairs in scorpions. The unfolded "pages" (plates) of the book lung maximize the surface area exposed to environmental air, and thereby maximize the amount of diffusional gas exchange. In most arachnid species, passive ventilation alone is sufficient to facilitate respiration needed for metabolism.

=== Occasionally absent ===
Many arachnids, such as mites and harvestmen, have no traces of book lungs and breathe through their body-surfaces only or through tracheae. Gas exchange is performed by the thin walls inside the cavity instead, or with their surface area increased by branching into the body as thin tubes, the tracheae. These tracheae may possibly have evolved directly from book lungs because the tracheae in some spiders have a small number of greatly elongated chambers.

== Arachnid taxonomy ==
The absence or presence of book lungs divides the Arachnida into two main groups:

The pulmonate arachnids
book lungs present; Tetrapulmonata (whip scorpions, Schizomida, Amblypygi, and spiders) and scorpions
The apulmonate arachnids
book lungs absent; microwhip scorpions, harvestmen, Acarina, pseudoscorpions, Ricinulei, and sunspiders

Tetrapulmonata have two pairs of book lungs found on the second and third abdominal segments (Schizomida have lost a pair, and most advanced spiders have replaced at least one of the pairs with trachea). Scorpions have four pairs of book lungs, found on abdominal segments number three, four, five, and six.

The pulmonate arachnids also appears to be the only members of Arachnida where the respiratory pigment hemocyanin is present in their blood.

One of the long-running controversies in arachnid evolution is whether the book lung evolved from book gills just once in a common arachnid ancestor, or whether book lungs evolved separately in several groups of arachnids as they came onto land. While the third abdominal segment in Tetrapulmonata have book lungs, the scorpions have a pair of sensory organs called pectines instead.

The oldest book lungs have been recovered from extinct trigonotarbid arachnids preserved in the 410 million-year-old Rhynie chert of Scotland. These Devonian fossil lungs are almost indistinguishable from the lungs of modern arachnids, fully adapted to a terrestrial existence.

== Book gills ==
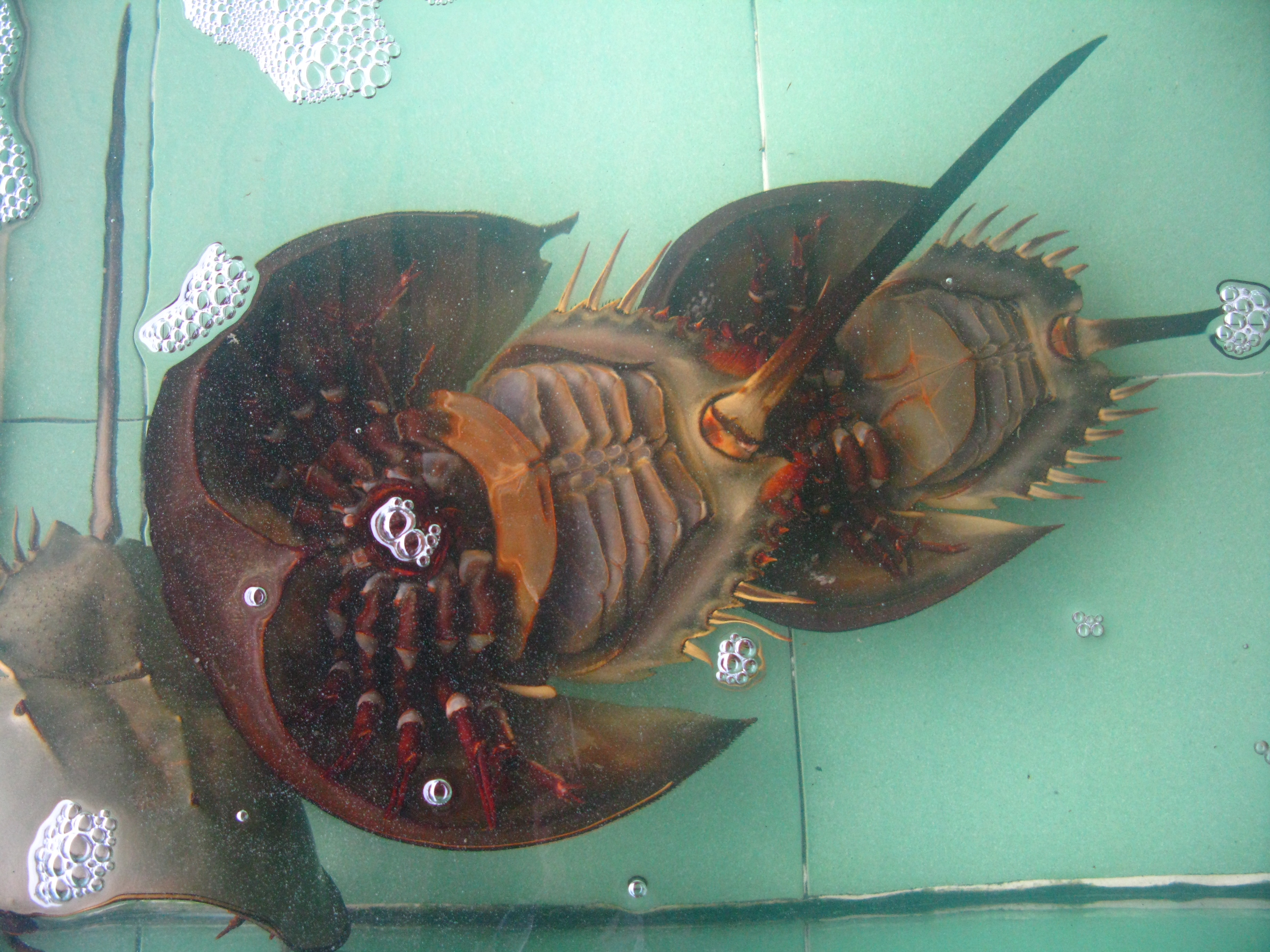
Underside of female horseshoe crabs showing the legs and book gills

Book lungs are thought to have evolved from book gills, water-breathing structures among marine chelicerates. Although they have a similar book-like structure, book gills are external, while book lungs are internal. Both are considered appendages rather than conventional internal organs, as they develop from limb buds before the buds flatten into segmented lamellae.

Book gills are still present in the marine arthropod Limulus (horseshoe crabs) which have five pairs of them, the flap in front of them being the genital operculum which lacks gills. Book gills are flap-like appendages that effect gas exchange within water and seem to have their origin as modified legs. On the inside of each appendage, over 100 thin page-like membranes, lamellae, appearing as pages in a book, are where gas exchange takes place. These appendages move rhythmically to drive blood in and out of the lamellae and to circulate water over them. Respiration being their main purpose, they can also be used for swimming in young individuals. If they are kept moist, the horseshoe crab can live on land for many hours.
