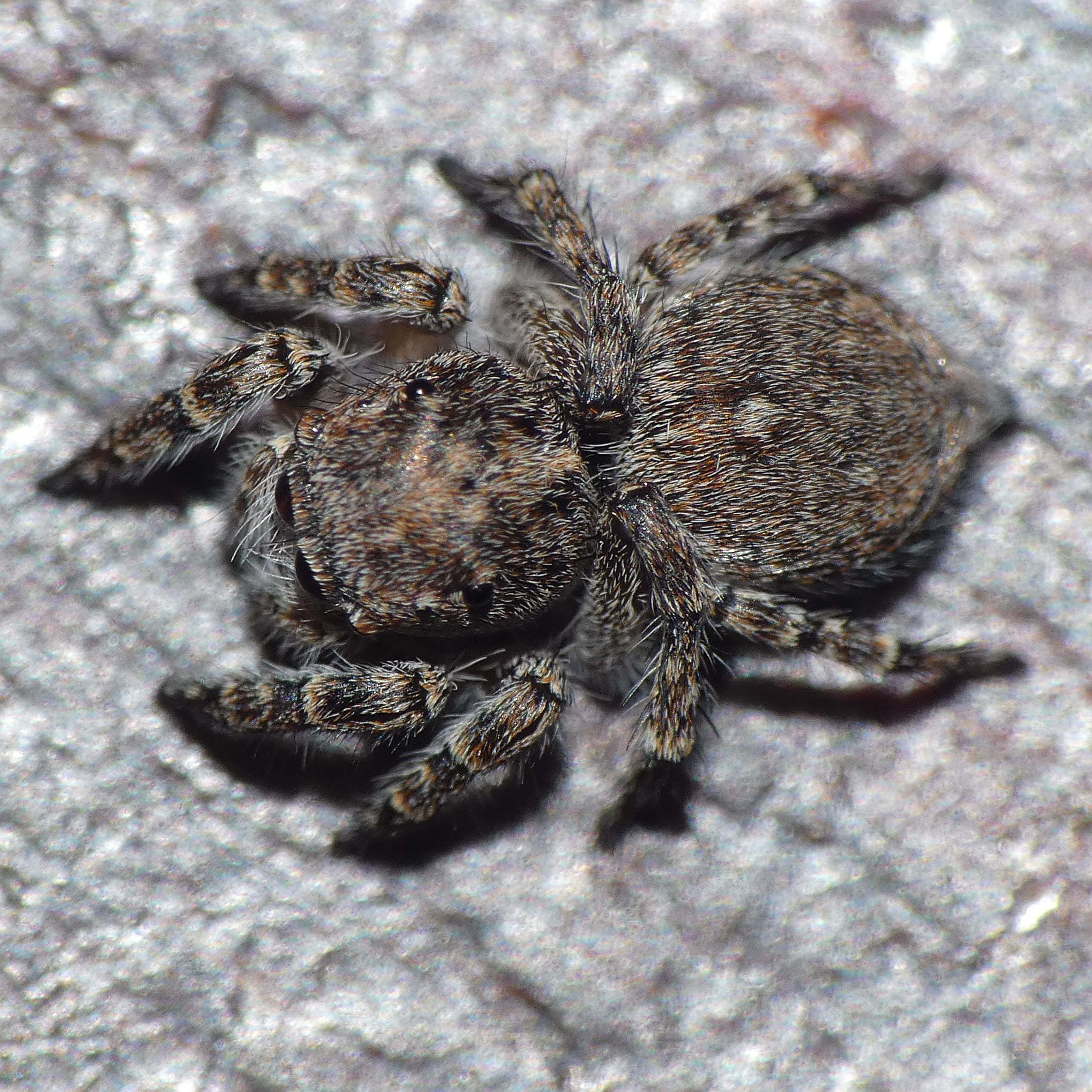
- A spider of the Langelurillus genus

Scientific classification
- Kingdom: Animalia
- Phylum: Arthropoda
- Subphylum: Chelicerata
- Class: Arachnida
- Order: Araneae
- Infraorder: Araneomorphae
- Family: Salticidae
- Genus: Langelurillus
- Species: L. minutus

Binomial name
- Langelurillus minutus Wesołowska & Cumming, 2011

= Langelurillus minutus =

Species of spider

Langelurillus minutus is a species of jumping spider in the genus Langelurillus that lives in Namibia and Zimbabwe. It was first described in 2011 by Wanda Wesołowska and Meg Cumming. The spider is small, with a cephalothorax that is between 1.8 and 2.3 mm (0.071 and 0.091 in) long and an abdomen between 1.5 and 3.9 mm (0.059 and 0.154 in) long. The male is noticeably smaller than the female, which is reflected in the species name. The species is generally brown, but has indistinct patches on its abdomen and orange or orange-yellow legs. The male has a very convex palpal bulb and the female an epigyne with a large pocket and compact multi-chambered receptacles.

== Taxonomy ==
Langelurillus minutus is a jumping spider that was first described by Wanda Wesołowska and Meg Cumming in 2011. It was one of over 500 species identified by the Polish arachnologist Wesołowska during her career, more than almost anyone in the discipline. They allocated it to the genus Langelurillus, which had been raised by Maciej Próchniewicz in 1994. The genus is related to Aelurillus and Langona but the spiders are smaller and, unlike these genera and Phlegra, they lack the parallel stripes on the back of the body that is feature of the majority of these spiders. In 2015, Wayne Maddison placed the genus in the subtribe Aelurillina, which also contained Aelurillus, Langona and Phlegra, in the tribe Aelurillini, within the subclade Saltafresia in the clade Salticoida. In 2016, Jerzy Prószyński placed the same genera in a group named Aelurillines based on the shape of the spiders' copulatory organs. The species is named after a Latin word that means tiny and relates to the size of the male's body.

== Description ==
Langelurillus minutus is a small spider. The male has a cephalothorax that is between 1.8 and 1.9 mm (0.071 and 0.075 in) long and between 1.3 and 1.4 mm (0.051 and 0.055 in) wide. The carapace is dark brown, high and covered with brown hairs. The eye field is darker, nearly black, with faint white hairs. The clypeus is low, dark and also has white hairs. The chelicerae are toothless and light brown and the labium is yellow. The abdomen is similar in size to the carapace, between 1.5 and 1.6 mm (0.059 and 0.063 in) long and between 1.2 and 1.3 mm (0.047 and 0.051 in) wide. It is brown, nearly spherical, and has a pattern of indistinct white patches. There is a scattering of white hairs and brown bristles. The underside is yellow. The spinnerets are brown and yellow. The legs are yellowish orange with brown spines. The pedipalps are yellow or light brown. The spider has a very convex palpal bulb with an embolus coiled around the tip, and has a very short tibular apophysis, or spike. The embolus is hidden behind a shield.

The female is larger than the male. It has a cephalothorax that is between 2.1 and 2.3 mm (0.083 and 0.091 in) long and 1.6 and 1.8 mm (0.063 and 0.071 in) wide. The carapace is dark brown, oval and high, covered with whiteish-grey hairs, and has a short black eye field. The clypeus is dark and the labium brown with pale tips. It has stout dark brown chelicerae with a short fang. The abdomen is substantially larger than the male, measuring between 3.5 and 3.9 mm (0.14 and 0.15 in) in length and 2.8 and 3.2 mm (0.11 and 0.13 in) in width. It is large, looking swollen, and brownish-grey with a pattern of indistinct lighter spots towards the middle. The underside is lighter. It has brown spinnerets. The orange legs are thick, short and marked by brown rings. The epigyne has a large pocket and long hairs to the back. The gonopores are also placed to the rear. The spider has short seminal ducts leading to compact and very sclerotized multi-chambered receptacles.

The spider is similar to the related Langelurillus orbicularis, but can be distinguished by the male's lack of a dorsal apophysis and the female's multi-chambered receptacles in its copulatory organs.

== Distribution ==
Almost all, if not all, Langelurillus spiders live in sub-Saharan Africa. Langelurillus minutus is found in Namibia and Zimbabwe. The male holotype was discovered in the Sengwa Wildlife Research Area, Zimbabwe, in 2000.
