= Langelurillus horrifer =

Scientific classification
- Kingdom: Animalia
- Phylum: Arthropoda
- Subphylum: Chelicerata
- Class: Arachnida
- Order: Araneae
- Infraorder: Araneomorphae
- Family: Salticidae
- Genus: Langelurillus
- Species: L. horrifer

Binomial name
- Langelurillus horrifer Rollard & Wesołowska, 2002

Species of jumping spider

Langelurillus horrifer is a species of jumping spider that lives in the Guinea Highlands. A member of the genus Langelurillus, the female was first described in 2002 and the male in 2025. It is a small brown spider that measures between 2.4 and 4.8 mm (0.094 and 0.189 in) in length. It is generally toothless, although some male specimen have very small signs of a tooth. The female of the species is distinguished from similar spiders, like Langelurillus difficilis, by its complicated epigyne, the external visible part of its copulatory organs, with its long spiralling seminal ducts. The male is almost indistinguishable from its relatives, only the shape of its tibial apophyses, with their small thorn-like spikes, helping to identify it.

== Taxonomy and etymology ==
Langelurillus horrifer is a jumping spider, a member of the family Salticidae, that was first described by the arachnologists Christine Rollard and Wanda Wesołowska in 2002. It was one of over 500 species identified by Wesołowska during her career. They allocated it to the genus Langelurillus, which had been raised by Maciej Próchniewicz in 1994.

Langelurillus is related to Aelurillus and Langona but the spiders are smaller and, unlike these genera and Phlegra, they lack the parallel stripes on the back of the body that is feature of the majority of these spiders. In 2015, Wayne Maddison placed the genus in the subtribe Aelurillina, which also contained Aelurillus, Langona and Phlegra, in the tribe Aelurillini, within the subclade Saltafresia in the clade Salticoida. In 2016, Jerzy Prószyński placed the same genera in a group named Aelurillines based on the shape of the spiders' copulatory organs. The species is named after a Latin word that means "terrible" and relates to the complicated structure of its epigyne, the external visible part the female's copulatory organs.

== Description ==
Langelurillus horrifer is a small spider. The female has a brown high carapace, the hard upper side of its front section, that typically has a length of 2.1 mm (0.083 in) and a width of 1.7 mm (0.067 in). It is covered with brown and grey hairs. There are long brown bristles and small yellowish-fawn scales near its eyes. The underside of this section, known as the spider's sternum, is orange. Its chelicerae, which act as its jaws, are brown and toothless. The remainder of its mouthparts are generally orange, its maxillae having white tips.

Behind its carapace, the female has a rounded and more squat abdomen, typically 2.7 mm (0.11 in) long and 2.5 mm (0.098 in) wide. It is brownish-beige on top, with a few brown hairs visible on its surface, and lighter underneath. It has yellow spinnerets that it uses to spin webs and its legs are light brown with brown hairs. The spider has an oval epigyne, raised in the middle, with two large depressions to the rear. The seminal ducts are long, spiralling into eight loops, and lead to spermathecae, or receptacles, that have two chambers.

The male is generally smaller than the female. Its forward section is typically 1.4 mm (0.055 in) long and 1 mm (0.039 in) wide. Its carapace is also high but is dark brown and has a black eye field. There are fawn and white scales and a patch of white hair and dark bristles around its eyes. Its sternum is darker. There is small signs of a single tooth in some specimen but generally the male is toothless like the female. Its mouthparts are dark brown with white tips at the end of its maxillae.

The male's abdomen is even smaller than its carapace, measuring typically 1 mm (0.039 in) in length and 0.8 mm (0.031 in) in width. It is black and has a pattern of a mosaic of small lighter dots. Its spinnerets are darker and its legs are dark brown or black. It has a dark brown pedipalp that has dark and white hairs on it. Its pedipalp has a tibia that has two crooked projections, or palpal tibial apophyses that end in small thorn-like spikes. On top of this tibia is a cymbium and a palpal bulb that bulges at its bottom and contains a hidden embolus.

The species has similarities to others in the genus, particularly Langelurillus difficilis and Langelurillus nigritus. The female can be distinguished by its long and complicated seminal organs and greater evidence of sclerotization on its copulatory organs. The male is almost indistinguishable, differing only in the shape of its tibial apophyses.

== Distribution ==
Almost all, if not all, Langelurillus spiders live in sub-Saharan Africa. Langelurillus horrifer is endemic to Guinea. It is only found in the Guinea Highlands. The female holotype was collected on the road to Bakoré in 1956, at an altitude of 500 m (1,600 ft) above sea level. It lives in leaf litter found on the ground of primary forest and secondary forest, near rivers and in savanna.
