= Langelurillus squamiger =

Scientific classification
- Kingdom: Animalia
- Phylum: Arthropoda
- Subphylum: Chelicerata
- Class: Arachnida
- Order: Araneae
- Infraorder: Araneomorphae
- Family: Salticidae
- Genus: Langelurillus
- Species: L. squamiger

Binomial name
- Langelurillus squamiger Wesołowska & Haddad, 2018

Species of jumping spider

Langelurillus squamiger is a species of jumping spider that lives in South Africa. A member of the genus Langelurillus, the species was first described in 2018 by the arachnologists Wanda Wesołowska and Charles Haddad. It is small, the male being slightly smaller than the female, with a forward section, or cephalothorax, that is between 1.9 and 2.4 mm (0.075 and 0.094 in) long and, behind that, an abdomen between 1.5 and 2.4 mm (0.059 and 0.094 in) long. It is generally dark brown, with an orange pattern on the abdomen. It is very similar to other spiders in the genus, but differs in its copulatory organ. The shape of the male's tibial apophyses are distinctive as is the way that the female has both lobes at the back of the epigyne and short seminal ducts. The spider lives amongst the leaves at the base of trees and eats Odontotermes termites alongside the jumping spiders Stenaelurillus guttiger and Stenaelurillus modestus.

== Taxonomy and etymology ==
Langelurillus squamiger is a jumping spider, a member of the family Salticidae, that was first described by the arachnologists Wanda Wesołowska and Charles Haddad in 2018. It was one of over 500 species identified by Wesołowska during her career. The species is named for the Latin word for scaly.

They allocated it to the genus Langelurillus, which had been circumscribed by Maciej Próchniewicz in 1994. The genus is related to Aelurillus and Langona but the spiders are smaller and, unlike these genera and Phlegra, they lack the parallel stripes on the back of the body that is feature of the majority of these spiders. In 2015, Wayne Maddison placed the genus in the subtribe Aelurillina, which also contained Aelurillus, Langona and Phlegra, in the tribe Aelurillini, within the subclade Saltafresia in the clade Salticoida. In 2016, Jerzy Prószyński placed the same genera in a group named Aelurillines based on the shape of the spiders' copulatory organ. The holotype of the species is stored in the National Collection of Arachnida, ARC, in the University of Pretoria.

== Description ==
Langelurillus squamiger is a small spider. The male has a cephalothorax, or forward section of its body, that is between 1.9 and 2.1 mm (0.075 and 0.083 in) long and between 1.4 and 1.6 mm (0.055 and 0.063 in) wide. The hard upper part of its cephalothorax, its carapace, is dark brown, rather high and covered with short white hairs. It has a black eye field. The part of its underside known as its sternum is generally yellowish with a central area that has a hint of grey. The spider's chelicerae are brown and toothless. Its remaining mouthparts, including its labium and maxillae, are light brown.

Behind its cephalothorax, the spider's abdomen is smaller than the carapace, between 1.5 and 1.7 mm (0.059 and 0.067 in) long and between 1.3 and 1.4 mm (0.051 and 0.055 in) wide. It is rounded and brown, with a pattern made up of yellow patches. The underside is yellowish-grey. The spider's spinnerets are black and yellow. The spider has yellowish-brown and very hairy legs that have many brown leg spines.

The male spider's copulatory organs are distinctive. Its pedipalps, which are near the front of the spider, are brown and also very hairy, and terminates in a very convex tegulum with small toothlike appendages or spikes. The spider has a number of tibial apophyes, or spikes on its palpal tibia, that have a distinctive shape. Its palpal bulb has an embolus emanating from it that coils around its tip. The embolus is hidden behind a shield.

The female is larger than the male, with a carapace typically 2.4 mm (0.094 in) long and between 1.6 and 1.9 mm (0.063 and 0.075 in) wide and an abdomen measuring between 2.2 and 2.4 mm (0.087 and 0.094 in) in length and 1.7 and 2.0 mm (0.067 and 0.079 in) in width. The carapace is similar to colour to the male and the abdomen is darker. The spider has a broad epigyne, the external visible part of the female copulatory organs, with a strongly sclerotised plate on the back half and two distinctive lobes. Internally, it has short seminal ducts leading to oval spermathecae, or receptacles.

The spider is similar to related spiders, particularly Langelurillus orbicularis, but can be distinguished by the shape of the male's tibial apophyses and the morphology of the female's copulatory organs. The particular, the female of the two species have a very similar epigyne but Langelurillus orbicularis is less sclerotised and lacks the two lobes seen on this species. Lobes can also be found on the female Langelurillus manifestus, but this species has much longer looping seminal ducts.

== Behaviour ==
Jumping spiders species often live in mixtures of species for mutual advantage. Langelurillus squamiger was found living near, and eating, Odontotermes termites. The spider was found alongside the jumping spiders Stenaelurillus guttiger and Stenaelurillus modestus; both also are known to eat termites. Although it lives in dense groups, the spider has been found in less dense populations than the other jumping spiders.

== Distribution and habitat ==
Almost all, if not all, Langelurillus spiders live in sub-Saharan Africa. Langelurillus squamiger is endemic to South Africa. The holotype was discovered in the Tembe Elephant Park in 2015. It lives in leaf litter.
