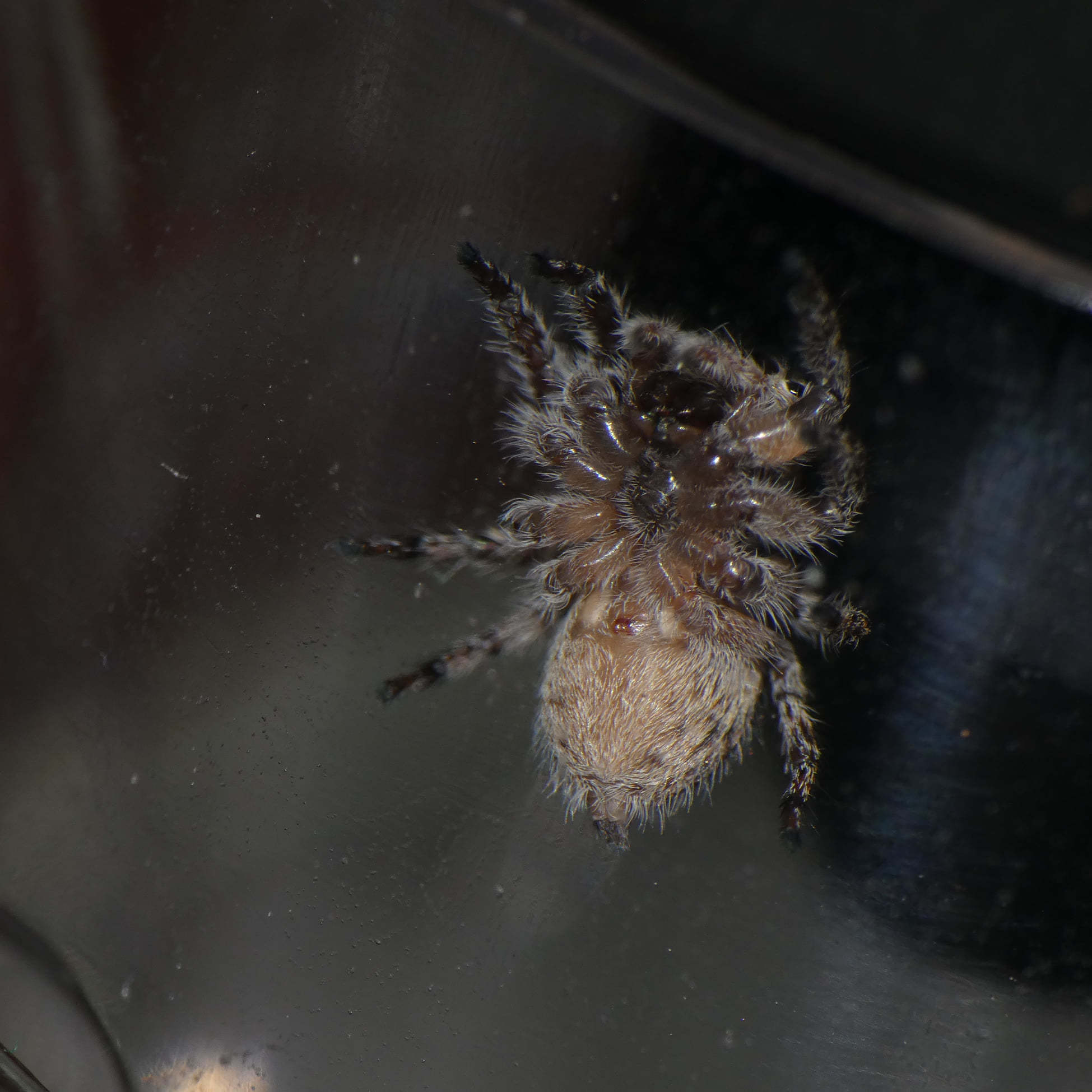
- A spider of the Langelurillus genus

Scientific classification
- Kingdom: Animalia
- Phylum: Arthropoda
- Subphylum: Chelicerata
- Class: Arachnida
- Order: Araneae
- Infraorder: Araneomorphae
- Family: Salticidae
- Genus: Langelurillus
- Species: L. krugeri

Binomial name
- Langelurillus krugeri Wesołowska & Haddad, 2013

= Langelurillus krugeri =

Species of spider

Langelurillus krugeri is a species of jumping spider in the genus Langelurillus that lives in South Africa. The species was first described in 2013 by Wanda Wesołowska and Charles Haddad. The spider is small with a brownish-grey abdomen typically 2.9 mm (0.11 in) long and a black carapace typically 1.9 mm (0.075 in) long. The species is named after Paul Kruger, who had been State President of the South African Republic. The first example was found in the Kruger National Park. The female can be distinguished from other spiders in the genus, particularly Langelurillus primus, in the design of its copulatory organs. The male has not been described.

== Taxonomy ==
Langelurillus krugeri is a jumping spider that was first described by Wanda Wesołowska and Charles Haddad in 2013. It was one of over 500 species identified by the Polish arachnologist Wesołowska during her career, maker her one of the most prolific scientists in the field. They allocated it to the genus Langelurillus, which had been raised by Maciej Próchniewicz in 1994. The genus is related to Aelurillus and Langona but the spiders are smaller and, unlike these genera and Phlegra, they lack the parallel stripes on the back of the body that is feature of the majority of these spiders. In 2015, Wayne Maddison placed the genus in the subtribe Aelurillina, which also contained Aelurillus, Langona and Phlegra, in the tribe Aelurillini, within the subclade Saltafresia in the clade Salticoida. In 2016, Jerzy Prószyński placed the same genera in a group named Aelurillines based on the shape of the spiders' copulatory organs. The species is named after Paul Kruger, a previous State President of the South African Republic.

== Description ==
Langelurillus krugeri is a small spider. The female has a high pear-shaped carapace that has a typical length of 1.9 mm (0.075 in) and a width of 1.6 mm (0.063 in). It is black and covered in small hairs with long brown bristles on its eye field. The clypeus is dark and of medium height. The chelicerae are toothless. The labium and other mouthparts are dark. The abdomen is rounded and brownish-grey, typically 2.9 mm (0.11 in) long and2.6 mm (0.10 in) wide. The underside is dark. The spinnerets are yellowish-grey and the relatively short legs are yellowish, with brown hairs and spines.The spider has a wide epigyne with two rounded depressions and short seminal ducts leading to multi-chambered highly sclerotised receptacles.

The species has similarities to others in the genus, but the spider has distinctive copulatory organs. For example, it differs from Langelurillus primus in having shorter seminal ducts and spermathecae next to the furrow on the epigyne.

== Distribution and habitat ==
Almost all, if not all, Langelurillus spiders live in sub-Saharan Africa. Langelurillus krugeri is endemic to South Africa. The holotype was discovered in the Kruger National Park in 2009. It lives on the ground in savannah woodland.
