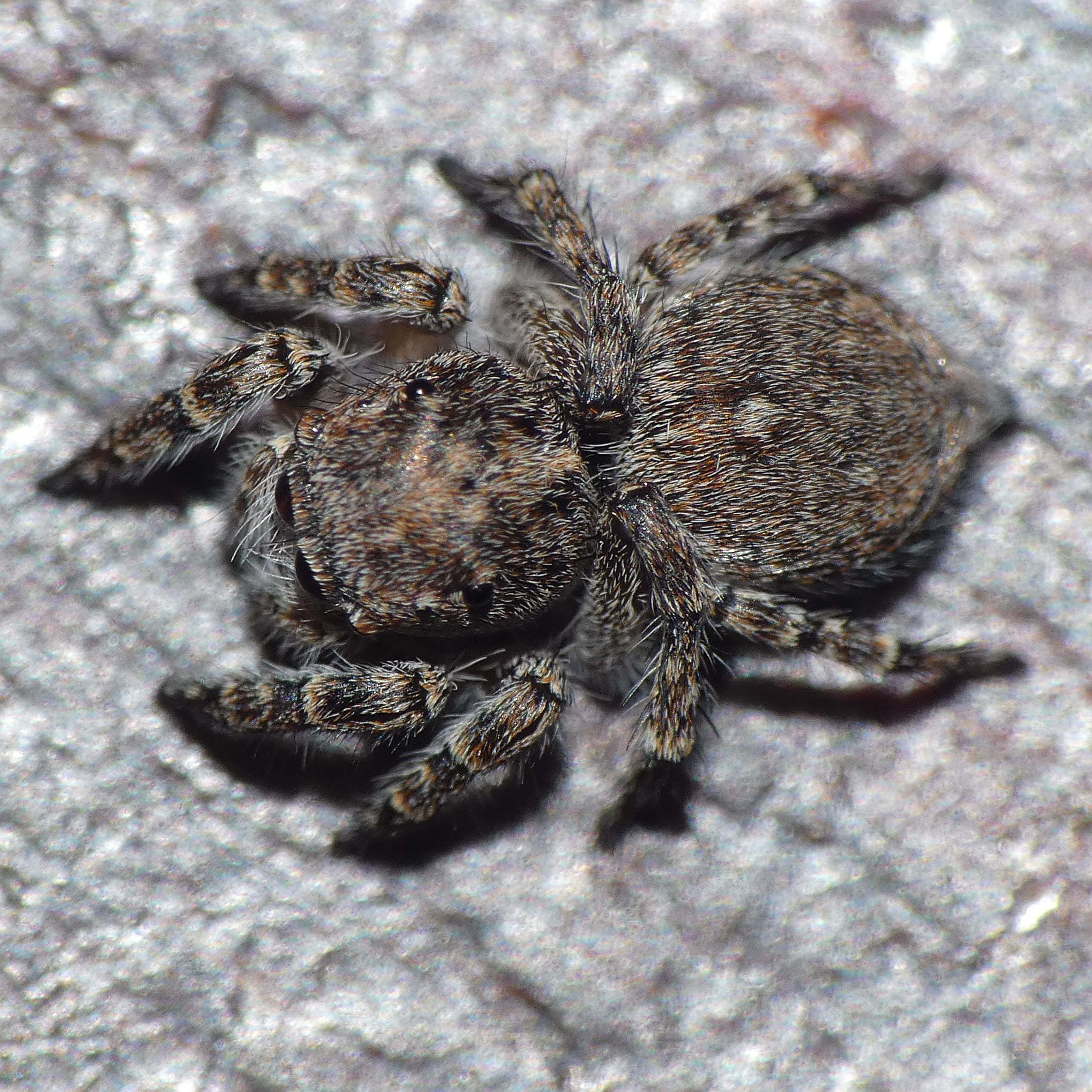
- A spider of the Langelurillus genus

Scientific classification
- Kingdom: Animalia
- Phylum: Arthropoda
- Subphylum: Chelicerata
- Class: Arachnida
- Order: Araneae
- Infraorder: Araneomorphae
- Family: Salticidae
- Genus: Langelurillus
- Species: L. primus

Binomial name
- Langelurillus primus Próchniewicz, 1994

= Langelurillus primus =

Species of spider

Langelurillus primus is the type species for the genus Langelurillus. It is a jumping spider that is endemic in Kenya first described in 1994 by Maciej Próchniewicz, the species name denoting its position as first to be identified. The spider is small, with an orange-brown or dark brown carapace that is between 2.2 and 2.8 mm (0.087 and 0.110 in) long and a dark yellow, greyish-brown or yellowish-green abdomen between 1.95 and 3.5 mm (0.077 and 0.138 in) long. The female is longer than the male. The abdomen often has a pattern of spots. It has hairy legs. The male has three tibial apophyses, or spikes, a short pointed embolus and a large ovoid tegulum. The female has a very small epigyne that has a single pocket. The species can be distinguished from the related Langelurillus kenyaensis and Langelurillus krugeri by the design of the female copulatory organs, particularly the length of the seminal ducts.

== Taxonomy ==
Langelurillus primus is a jumping spider species first described by Maciej Próchniewicz in 1994. Próchniewicz allocated it as the type species of the genus Langelurillus, raised at the same time. The species name is based on the Latin word for first, as it was the first to be identified and listed. The genus is related to Aelurillus and Langona but the spiders are smaller and, unlike these genera and Phlegra, they lack the parallel stripes on the back of the body that is feature of the majority of these spiders. In 2015, Wayne Maddison listed the genus in the subtribe Aelurillina, which also contains Aelurillus, Langona and Phlegra, in the tribe Aelurillini, within the subclade Saltafresia in the clade Salticoida. In 2016, Jerzy Prószyński placed the same genera in a group named Aelurillines based on the shape of the spiders' copulatory organs.

== Description ==
Langelurillus primus is a small spider. The male has an orange-brown carapace that is typically 2.2 mm (0.087 in) long and 1.65 mm (0.065 in) wide and has an orange pattern on its thorax. The eye field is brownish-black. The clypeus is yellowish-orange and slightly narrower than the diameter of some of the eyes. The chelicerae is yellowish-orange and toothless. The labium and sternum are also yellowish-orange. The yellowish-green abdomen is typically 1.95 mm (0.077 in) long has a pattern of greyish spots its back and rectangular scutum. It has black stripes on its spinnerets. The legs have brown hairs and spines. The pedipalp is hairy and has a large ovoid tegulum. It has three tibial apophyses, or spikes, and a prolateral tibial process that is shaped like a triangle. The embolus is short and pointed.

The female is slightly longer than the male. It has an orange-brown or dark brown pear-shaped carapace that is between 2.35 and 2.8 mm (0.093 and 0.110 in) long and 1.6 and 1.9 mm (0.063 and 0.075 in) wide and has a stripe down the middle made of white hairs. The clypeus is similar but covered in white hairs. The chelicerae are orange-brown or light brown with one small tooth towards the back in some examples. It has a less orange in its yellow labium and sternum, while the legs are short and orange-yellow or dark yellow and covered with dense brown hairs. The abdomen is greyish-brown or yellowish with brown spots and measures between 3.0 and 3.5 mm (0.12 and 0.14 in) long and typically 2.8 mm (0.11 in) wide. The underside is light. The epigyne is very small and has a single pocket and long tube-like seminal ducts that lead to multi-chambered and highly sclerotised oval spermathecae.

The spider is similar to others in the genus. The female can be distinguished from Langelurillus kenyaensis by its shorter and less looped seminal ducts. The related Langelurillus krugeri can be identified by its shorter seminal ducts and the way that the spermathecae are placed perpendicular, rather than parallel, to the epigastric furrow.

== Distribution ==
Almost all, if not all, Langelurillus spiders live in sub-Saharan Africa. Langelurillus primus is endemic to Kenya. The holotype was discovered in 1975 in Meru National Park. It was also found near Lake Bogoria in 1971 and has only been identified in those areas of the country.
