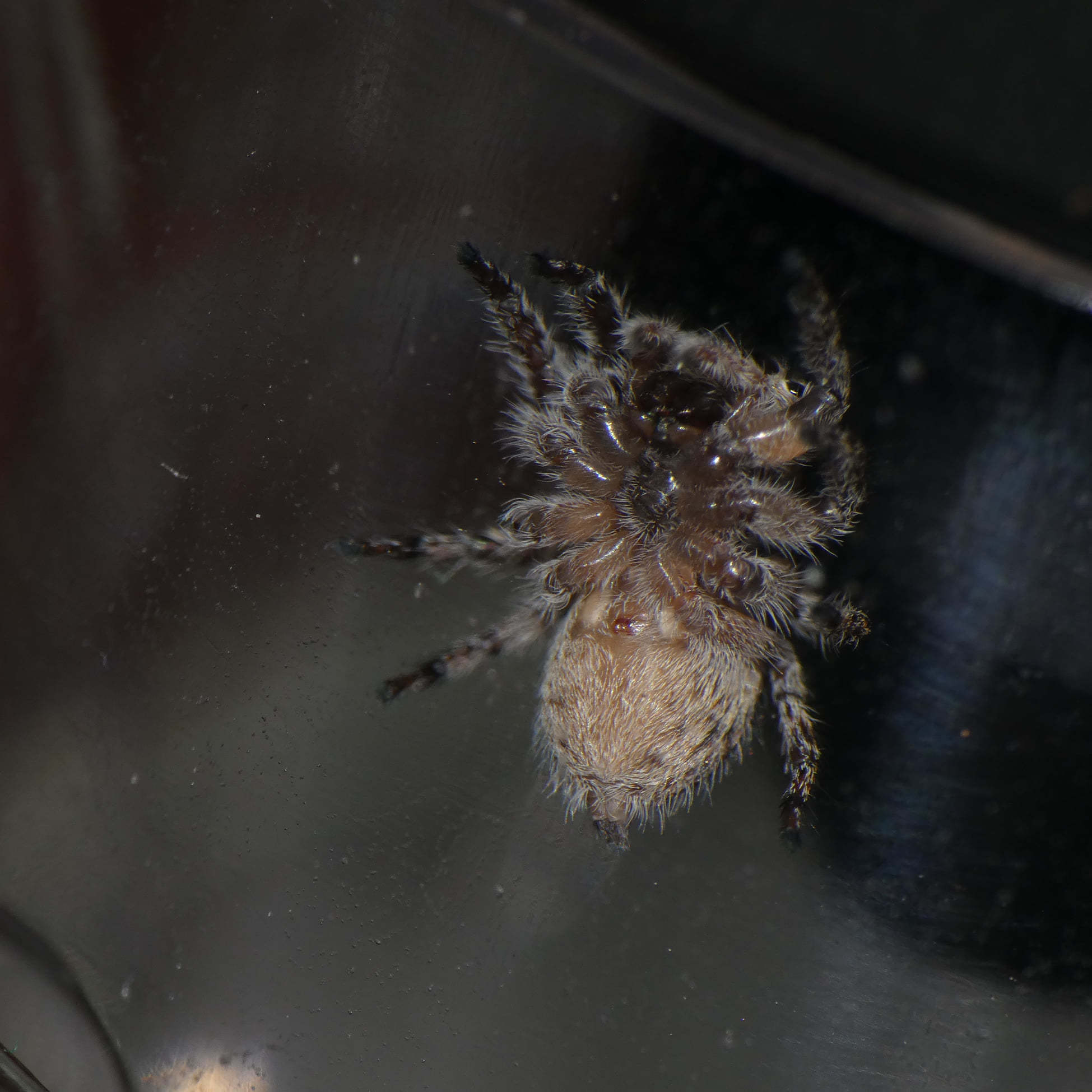
- A spider of the Langelurillus genus

Scientific classification
- Kingdom: Animalia
- Phylum: Arthropoda
- Subphylum: Chelicerata
- Class: Arachnida
- Order: Araneae
- Infraorder: Araneomorphae
- Family: Salticidae
- Genus: Langelurillus
- Species: L. holmi

Binomial name
- Langelurillus holmi Próchniewicz, 1994

= Langelurillus holmi =

Species of spider

Langelurillus holmi is a species of jumping spider in the genus Langelurillus that is endemic in Kenya. It was first described in 1994 by Maciej Próchniewicz. The spider is small, with an orange-brown carapace that is typically 1.9 mm (0.075 in) long and a round brown abdomen typically 1.3 mm (0.051 in) long. The abdomen is marked with a yellow cross-like pattern surrounding a diamond motif. The mouthparts and legs are orange-yellow. The male has a distinctive palpal bulb, particularly the shape of the appendages on the tibia. It has three tibial apophyses, or spikes, which is typical of the genus. The female has not been described.

== Taxonomy ==
Langelurillus holmi is a jumping spider that was first described by Maciej Próchniewicz in 1994. Próchniewicz allocated it to the then-new genus Langelurillus, raised at the same time. The genus is related to Aelurillus and Langona but the spiders are smaller and, unlike these genera and Phlegra, they lack the parallel stripes on the back of the body that is feature of the majority of these spiders. In 2015, Wayne Maddison listed the genus in the subtribe Aelurillina, which also contains Aelurillus, Langona and Phlegra, in the tribe Aelurillini, within the subclade Saltafresia in the clade Salticoida. In 2016, Jerzy Prószyński placed the same genera in a group named Aelurillines based on the shape of the spiders' copulatory organs.

== Description ==
Langelurillus holmi is a small spider. The male has an orange-brown carapace that is typically 1.9 mm (0.075 in) long and 1.4 mm (0.055 in) wide. The eye field is brown. The clypeus is also orange-yellow and slightly narrower than the diameter of some of the eyes. The chelicerae and labium are also orange-yellow. The round brown abdomen is typically 1.3 mm (0.051 in) long. It has a yellow pattern on its back and orange-brown scutum. The legs are orange-yellow. Although superficially similar, the spider can be readily distinguished from other species by the morphology of palpal bulb. The pedipalp is hairy, has a horn-shaped extension to the tibia and bump towards the middle of the femur. It has a complex of three tibial apophyses, or spikes, which is typical of the genus. They are unusual in shape, and concentrically curve into the centre. The embolus is short and pointed. The species can also be distinguished by the pattern on its abdomen, which consists of a cross-like marking around a central diamond. The female has not been described.

== Distribution ==
Almost all, if not all, Langelurillus spiders live in sub-Saharan Africa. Langelurillus holmi is endemic to Kenya. The holotype was discovered in 1970 on Diani Beach. It has only been found in that area of the country.
