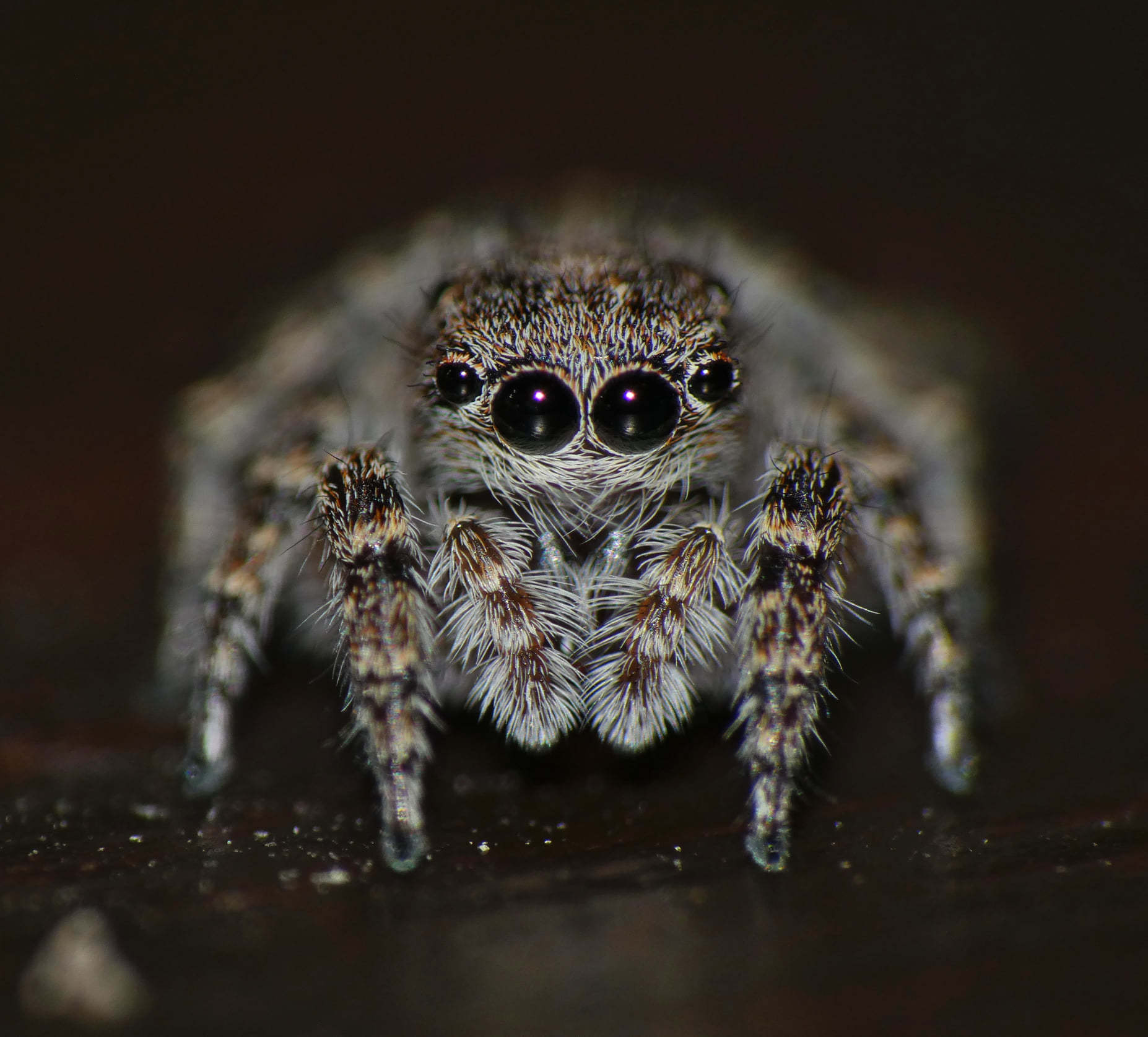
- A spider of the Langelurillus genus

Scientific classification
- Kingdom: Animalia
- Phylum: Arthropoda
- Subphylum: Chelicerata
- Class: Arachnida
- Order: Araneae
- Infraorder: Araneomorphae
- Family: Salticidae
- Genus: Langelurillus
- Species: L. quadrimaculatus

Binomial name
- Langelurillus quadrimaculatus Wesołowska & Russell-Smith, 2011

= Langelurillus quadrimaculatus =

Species of spider

Langelurillus quadrimaculatus is a species of jumping spider in the genus Langelurillus that lives in Nigeria. It was first described in 2011 by Wanda Wesołowska and Anthony Russell-Smith. The spider is small, with a cephalothorax that is between 1.7 and 2.5 mm (0.067 and 0.098 in) long and an abdomen between 2.0 and 2.2 mm (0.079 and 0.087 in) long. The female is larger than the male. It can be distinguished from other species in the genus by its abdominal pattern, which is recalled in the species name, that consists of two pairs of rounded yellow patches on a brownish-grey background. The female also has a distinctive internal layout of its seminal ducts within its short and wide epigyne.

== Taxonomy ==
Langelurillus quadrimaculatus is a jumping spider that was first described by Wanda Wesołowska and Anthony Russell-Smith in 2011. It was one of over 500 species identified by the Polish arachnologist Wesołowska during her career, making her one of the most prolific in the discipline. It was allocated it to the genus Langelurillus, which had been raised by Maciej Próchniewicz in 1994. The genus is related to Aelurillus and Langona but the spiders are smaller and, unlike these genera and Phlegra, lack the parallel stripes on the back of the body that is feature of the majority of these spiders. In 2015, Wayne Maddison placed the genus in the subtribe Aelurillina, which also contained Aelurillus, Langona and Phlegra, in the tribe Aelurillini, within the subclade Saltafresia in the clade Salticoida. In 2016, Jerzy Prószyński placed the same genera in a group named Aelurillines based on the shape of the spiders' copulatory organs. The species name recalls the pattern on the spider's abdomen.

== Description ==
Langelurillus quadrimaculatus is a small spider. The male has a cephalothorax that is between 1.7 and 1.9 mm (0.067 and 0.075 in) long and between 1.3 and 1.4 mm (0.051 and 0.055 in) wide. It has a brown high carapace, with a black eye field. The clypeus is orange and high. The chelicerae are toothless and the labium yellow. The abdomen is smaller and narrower than the carapace, nearly spherical in shape. It is between 1.3 and 1.5 mm (0.051 and 0.059 in) long and between 1.1 and 1.2 mm (0.043 and 0.047 in) wide. It is brownish-grey with a distinctive pattern made of two pairs of rounded yellow patches. The underside is light, with some specimens having two grey stripes. The spinnerets are black and light. The legs are yellow with brown hairs and spines. The pedipalps are dark brown with convex palpal bulb. There is a very long and thin dorsal apophysis, or spike, and a broad retrolateral tibial apophysis. The embolus is hidden behind a shield.

The female is larger than the male, with a cephalothorax between 2.3 and 2.4 mm (0.091 and 0.094 in) long and 1.7 and 1.8 mm (0.067 and 0.071 in) wide, and an abdomen measuring between 2.5 and 2.6 mm (0.098 and 0.102 in) in length and 2.1 and 2.2 mm (0.083 and 0.087 in) in width. The abdomen has a similar pattern to the male. The spider has orange to light brown legs and mottling on the sides of the abdomen. The epigyne is broad with gonopores situated on its sides. It has narrow seminal ducts leading to multi-chambered heavily sclerotized receptacles.

The spider has a distinctive abdominal pattern that distinguishes it from other members of the genus. It has some similarities to the related Langelurillus nigritus, but can be identified by the male copulatory organs, particularly the wide retrolateral tibial apophysis and long dorsal apophysis. The female has a shorter and wider epigyne than other species. The seminal ducts form a distinctive shape.

== Distribution and habitat ==
Almost all, if not all, Langelurillus spiders live in sub-Saharan Africa. Langelurillus quadrimaculatus is endemic to Nigeria. The male holotype and female paratype were discovered near Ibadan in 1973. It is found in both cultivated and fallow areas, including cowpea crops.
