= Langelurillus manifestus =

Scientific classification
- Kingdom: Animalia
- Phylum: Arthropoda
- Subphylum: Chelicerata
- Class: Arachnida
- Order: Araneae
- Infraorder: Araneomorphae
- Family: Salticidae
- Genus: Langelurillus
- Species: L. manifestus

Binomial name
- Langelurillus manifestus Wesołowska & Russell-Smith, 2000

Species of jumping spider

Langelurillus manifestus is a species of jumping spider in the genus Langelurillus that lives in Tanzania. The spider is small, with a forward section or carapace that is between 2.1 and 2.5 mm (0.083 and 0.098 in) long and, behind that, an abdomen between 2.0 and 2.2 mm (0.079 and 0.087 in) long. The female's carapace is smaller and lighter than the male's and has a pattern of irregular patches, which may also be found in some examples of the female abdomen. The male abdomen is lighter and has a fawn streak down the middle. The spider's legs are brown, the female having dark rings on its legs. It is similar to other related species, particularly Langelurillus rufus, but can be distinguished by the male's larger size and lighter coloration. The female has an oval epigyne, the external visible part of its copulatory organs, that leads to seminal ducts that are shorter than those found in the related Langelurillus rufus but longer than those Langelurillus squamiger. The spider was first described in 2000 by the arachnologists Wanda Wesołowska and Anthony Russell-Smith.

== Taxonomy ==
Langelurillus manifestus is a species of jumping spider, a member of the family Salticidae, that was first described by the arachnologists Wanda Wesołowska and Anthony Russell-Smith in 2000. It was one of over 500 species identified by the Polish arachnologist Wesołowska during her career. They allocated it to the genus Langelurillus, which had been circumscribed by Maciej Próchniewicz in 1994. The genus is related to Aelurillus and Langona but the spiders are smaller and, unlike these genera and Phlegra, they lack the parallel stripes on the back of the body that is feature of the majority of these spiders. In 2015, the evolutionary biologist Wayne Maddison undertook a phylogenetic classification that showed that the genus is a member of the subtribe Aelurillina, which also contained Aelurillus, Langona and Phlegra, in the tribe Aelurillini. This sits within the subclade Saltafresia in the clade Salticoida. In 2016, the arachnologist Jerzy Prószyński placed the same genera in a group named Aelurillines based on the shape of the copulatory organs. The species has a specific name that is based on a Latin word that means 'evident'. The holotype is kept at the Royal Museum for Central Africa in Tervuren.

== Description ==
Langelurillus manifestus is a small spider with distinctive characteristics. Its body is divided into two main parts: a forward section, known as its cephalothorax, and, behind that, an oval abdomen. The male has a carapace, the hard upper part of the cephalothorax, that is between 2.3 and 2.5 mm (0.091 and 0.098 in) long and typically 1.9 mm (0.075 in) wide. It is dark brown, rather high and covered with very short grey hairs with a short black eye field. The part of its face known as its clypeus also has grey hairs. Its chelicerae are brown with two very small teeth visible to the front while its labium, another part of its mouthparts, is orange.

The male's abdomen is similar in size to the carapace, between 2.0 and 2.2 mm (0.079 and 0.087 in) long and between 1.6 and 1.7 mm (0.063 and 0.067 in) wide. It is yellowish-orange, darker towards the edges, with a fawn streak down the middle and a pattern of four dots making a trapezium shape. The underside is pale yellow. Its spinnerets, used for spinning webs, are black and yellow. Its legs are light brown with brown spines. Its copulatory organs are distinctive. Its pedipalps have a very convex palpal bulb that ends in an embolus that coils around its tip. There is a very short tegular apophysis, or spike, and three tibial apophysis. Its embolus is hidden behind a shield.

The female has a carapace that is smaller than the male, between 2.1 and 2.3 mm (0.083 and 0.091 in) long and 1.6 and 1.8 mm (0.063 and 0.071 in) wide. It is brown with two large irregular patches visible on the thorax similar to Langelurillus rufus. The eye field has short fawn and grey hairs. It has light brown chelicerae and a yellow or orange labium. The abdomen is similar in size to the male, measuring between 2.0 and 2.1 mm (0.079 and 0.083 in) in length and 1.9 and 2.0 mm (0.075 and 0.079 in) in width. The top is fawn and covered in brown hairs, with some examples having a pattern of irregular brown patches. The bottom of the abdomen is light. The spider has generally brown legs marked with dark rings. Its epigyne, the external visible part of its copulatory organs, is oval with two large lateral depressions, and intensely sclerotized. It has rather large copulatory openings leading to short seminary ducts and globular receptacles.

The spider is similar to the related Langelurillus rufus, but can be distinguished by the male's larger size, lighter coloration, wider palpal bulb and more curved dorsal apophysis. The female has a narrower epigyne and shorter seminal ducts. The spider can be distinguished from Langelurillus orbicularis by the shape of the male's tibial apophysis and the morphology of the female's seminal ducts. The female is also similar to Langelurillus squamiger, but differs in the way that species has even shorter seminal ducts and having much longer lobes at the rear of its eiipyne.

== Distribution and habitat ==
Almost all, if not all, Langelurillus spiders live in sub-Saharan Africa. Langelurillus manifestus is endemic to Tanzania. The male holotype and female paratype were discovered in 1995 in the Mkomazi National Park. The spider is generally only found in very dry bushland, particularly in areas of Commiphora shrubs.
