= Asianellus festivus =

- female
- male

Scientific classification
- Kingdom: Animalia
- Phylum: Arthropoda
- Subphylum: Chelicerata
- Class: Arachnida
- Order: Araneae
- Infraorder: Araneomorphae
- Family: Salticidae
- Genus: Asianellus
- Species: A. festivus

Binomial name
- Asianellus festivus (C. L. Koch, 1834)

Synonyms
- Euophrys festiva C. L. Koch, 1834; Euophrys striata C. L. Koch, 1846; Attus melanotarsus Grube, 1861; Attus gilvus Simon, 1868; Phlegra festiva (C. L. Koch, 1834); Phlegra pichoni Schenkel, 1963; Aelurillus festivus (C. L. Koch, 1834)

Species of spider

Asianellus festivus is a species of jumping spider in the family Salticidae. Originally described as Euophrys festiva by Carl Ludwig Koch in 1834, this species has undergone several taxonomic revisions and was transferred to the genus Asianellus by Logunov & Hęciak in 1996.

The specific name festivus is derived from Latin, meaning "festive" or "joyful".

== Taxonomy ==
The species was first described by C. L. Koch in 1834 under the name Euophrys festiva. It has a complex taxonomic history, having been placed in several genera including Euophrys, Phlegra, Aelurillus, and finally Asianellus. The genus Asianellus was established in 1996 specifically to accommodate the festivus species group from Aelurillus, with A. festivus serving as the type species.

== Distribution ==
A. festivus has a broad Palearctic distribution. It is found across Europe, the Caucasus, Russia (from European Russia to the Far East), Kazakhstan, China, Korea, and Japan. The species has been recorded as new to several countries in recent years, including Lithuania and Serbia. Stanković describes it as a trans-Eurasian temperate species. In China, it has been documented from numerous provinces including Beijing, Hebei, Inner Mongolia, Jilin, Heilongjiang, Zhejiang, Anhui, Shandong, Hunan, Guangxi, Guizhou, Tibet, Shaanxi, and Gansu.

== Habitat ==
A. festivus occurs in dry, mostly sunny spots, often preferring rocky terrains. It can also be found in warm, sunny rock fields, slopes and in grass or on land dominated by mosses or lichens, dry grasslands, and habitats with very sparse or no vegetation.

== Description ==
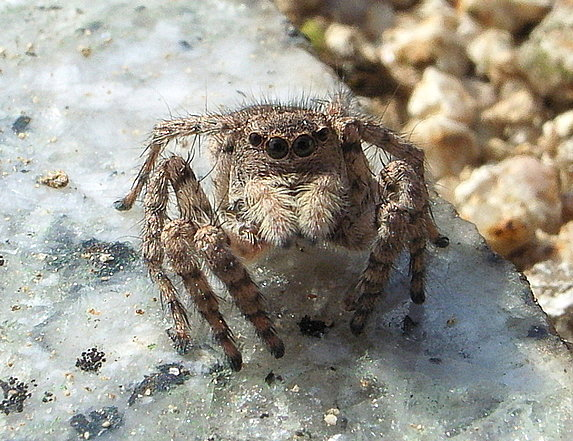
female from Japan

Like many jumping spiders, A. festivus exhibits sexual dimorphism in both size and coloration. Body lengths of collected specimens from Serbia were: male 6 mm, females 7.8 and 8.0 mm. According to literature data, male body length can reach 6-7 mm, while females measure 6.5-8.5 mm.

The epigyne bears sclerotized copulatory openings and an epigynal pocket. The male pedipalp has a tibial apophysis with two unequally long processes and a thin, coiled embolus.

== Behavior and ecology ==
Adults of both sexes are active from March to November, being mostly active in May-September, though some sources indicate males are active in March-September and females in March-August.
