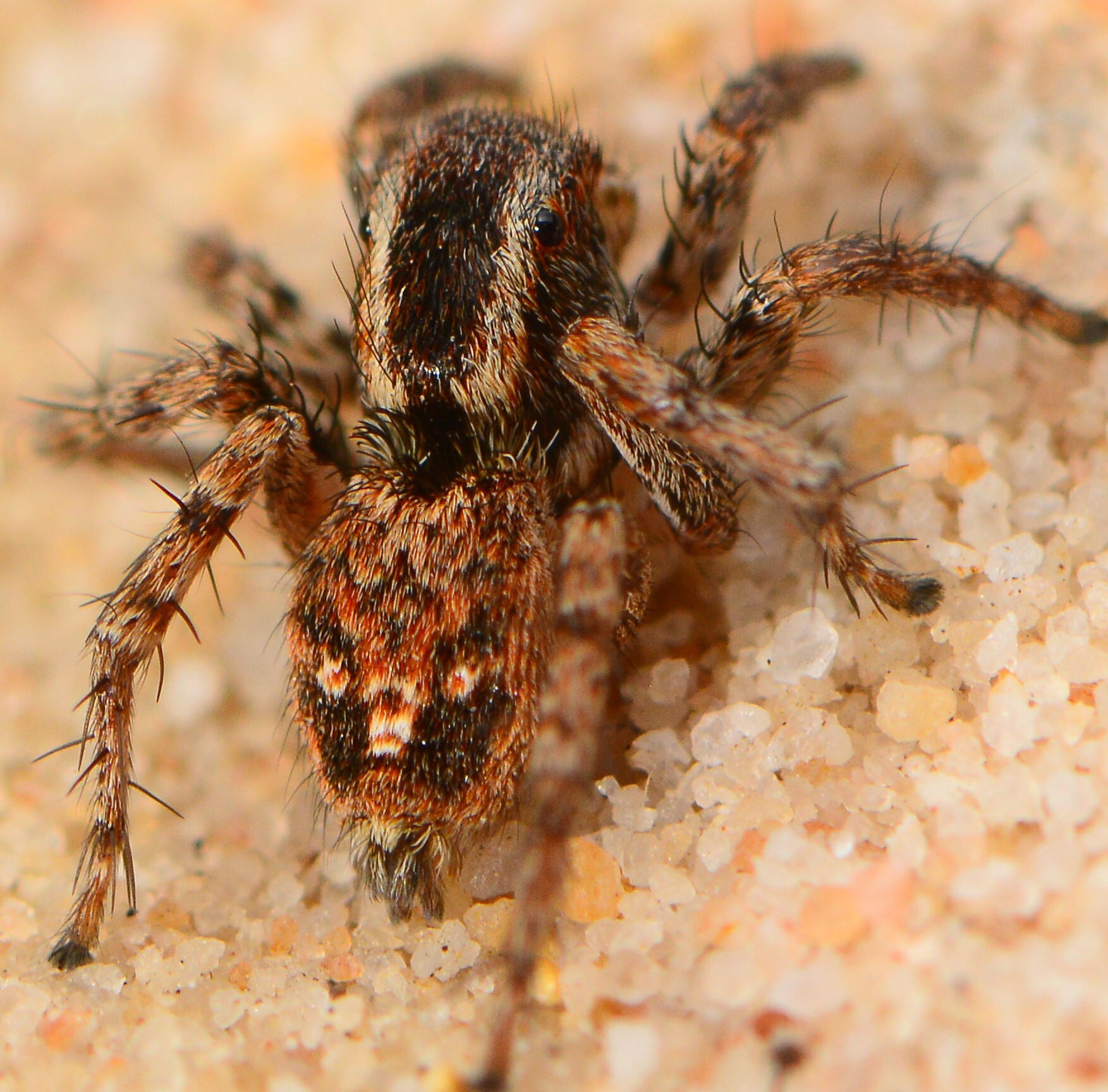
- female
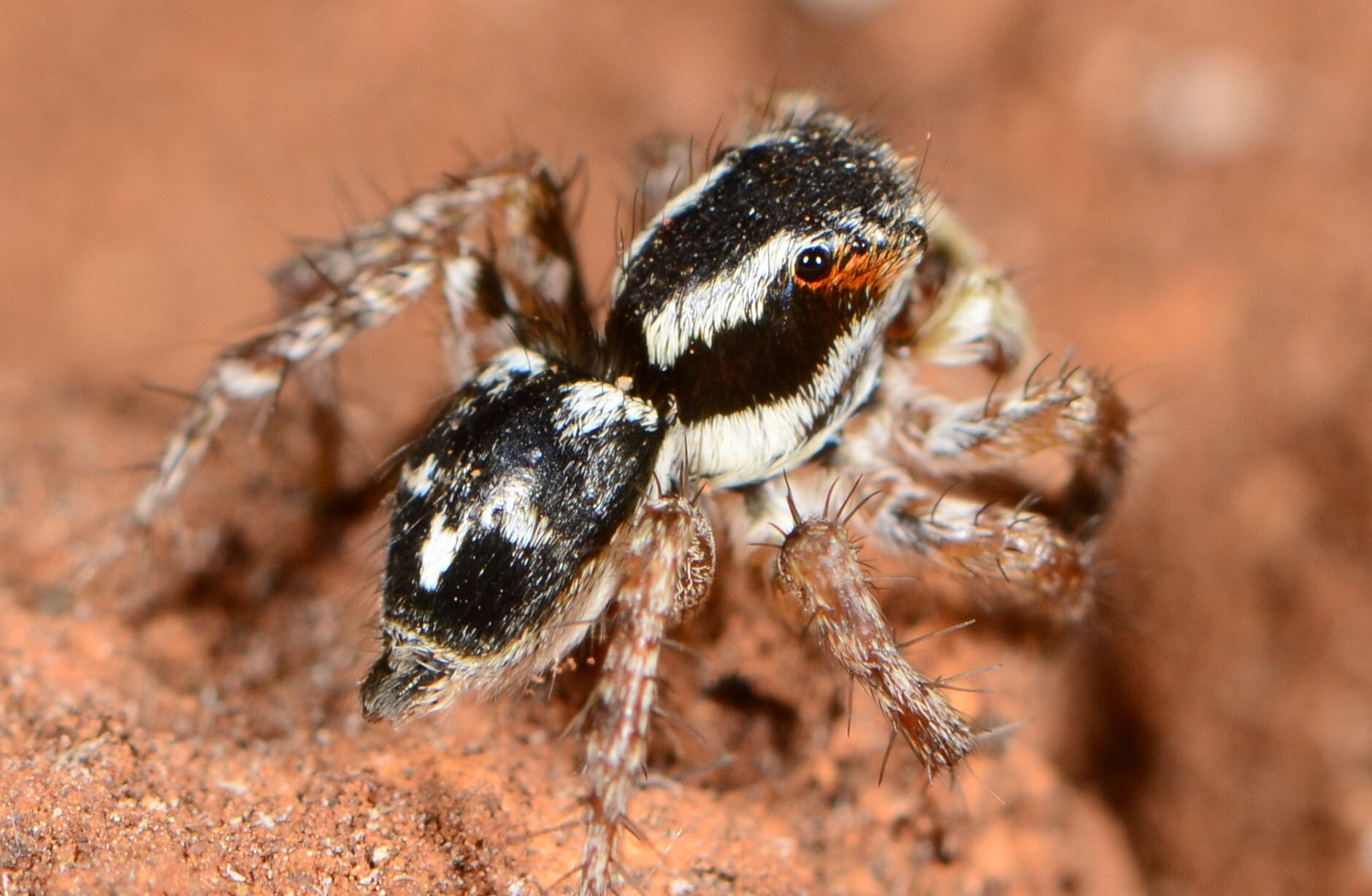
- male

Scientific classification
- Kingdom: Animalia
- Phylum: Arthropoda
- Subphylum: Chelicerata
- Class: Arachnida
- Order: Araneae
- Infraorder: Araneomorphae
- Family: Salticidae
- Genus: Stenaelurillus
- Species: S. guttiger

Binomial name
- Stenaelurillus guttiger (Simon, 1901)

Synonyms
- Aelurillus guttiger Simon, 1901; Stenaelurillus natalensis Haddad & Wesołowska, 2006

= Stenaelurillus guttiger =

Species of jumping spider

Stenaelurillus guttiger (synonyms Aelurillus guttiger and Stenaelurillus natalensis) is a species of jumping spider in the genus Stenaelurillus that is native to southern Africa. It was first described in 1901 by Eugène Simon based on examples found in South Africa, and subsequently also identified in Botswana, Mozambique and Zimbabwe. Initially allocated to the genus Aelurillus, the species was moved to its current genus in 1974. The spider is medium-sized, with a carapace that is between 2.0 and 2.75 mm (0.079 and 0.108 in) long and an abdomen that is between 1.8 and 2.9 mm (0.071 and 0.114 in) long. It is dark brown or brown, and has a pattern of white hairs on both the abdomen and carapace and a pattern of two stripes on the carapace. The abdomen has a white pattern of straight and V-shaped stripes and spots which varies between specimens. The colouring of the clypeus and legs can also range from yellow to dark brown depending on the particular example. It is distinguished from other species in the genus by the design of its sexual organs. The male has an embolus that is short and crab like. The female has a flat plate epigyne with widely separated copulatory openings and insemination ducts and a deep narrow pocket. Stenaelurillus guttiger feeds on termites, particularly Macrotermes and Odontotermes.

== Taxonomy ==
Aelurillus guttiger was first described by the naturalist Eugène Simon in 1901. A species of jumping spider, a member of the family Salticidae, it was initially placed in the genus Aelurillus, which had been created by Simon in 1885. The genus name derives from the Greek word for cat. In 1974, it was moved to Stenaelurillus by D. J. Clark on the basis of its general appearance, and particularly, the similarity between the markings on this spider and those on the abdomen and carapace of Stenaelurillus albopunctatus. The genus Stenaelurillus had been first described by Simon in 1886, with the type species Stenaelurillus nigricaudus. In 2015, Wayne Maddison placed the genus in the subtribe Aelurillina in the tribe Aelurillini in the clade Saltafresia. Two years later, the genus was grouped with nine other genera of jumping spiders under the name Aelurillines by Jerzy Prószyński.

Meanwhile, in 2006, arachnologists Charles R. Haddad from South Africa and Wanda Wesołowska from Poland identified a new species, Stenaelurillus natalensis. It was one of over 500 species identified by Wesołowska during her career. This new species was generally similar to Stenaelurillus guttiger but differed in that the tip of the males's embolus was hidden and there was a chamber in the female's epigyne. In 2018, Dmitri V. Logunov and Galina N Azarkina found the sexual organs to be similar across the specimens of both species and consequently they combined them under the current name. The holotype for Stenaelurillus natalensis was designated the holotype for Stenaelurillus guttiger.

== Description ==
Stenaelurillus guttiger is a medium-sized spider. It has an overall shape that is typical for the genus but shows a high variation in patterns and colours. This does not seem to depend on geographic location with, for example, males with different colour legs and palpal bulbs often living in the same area.

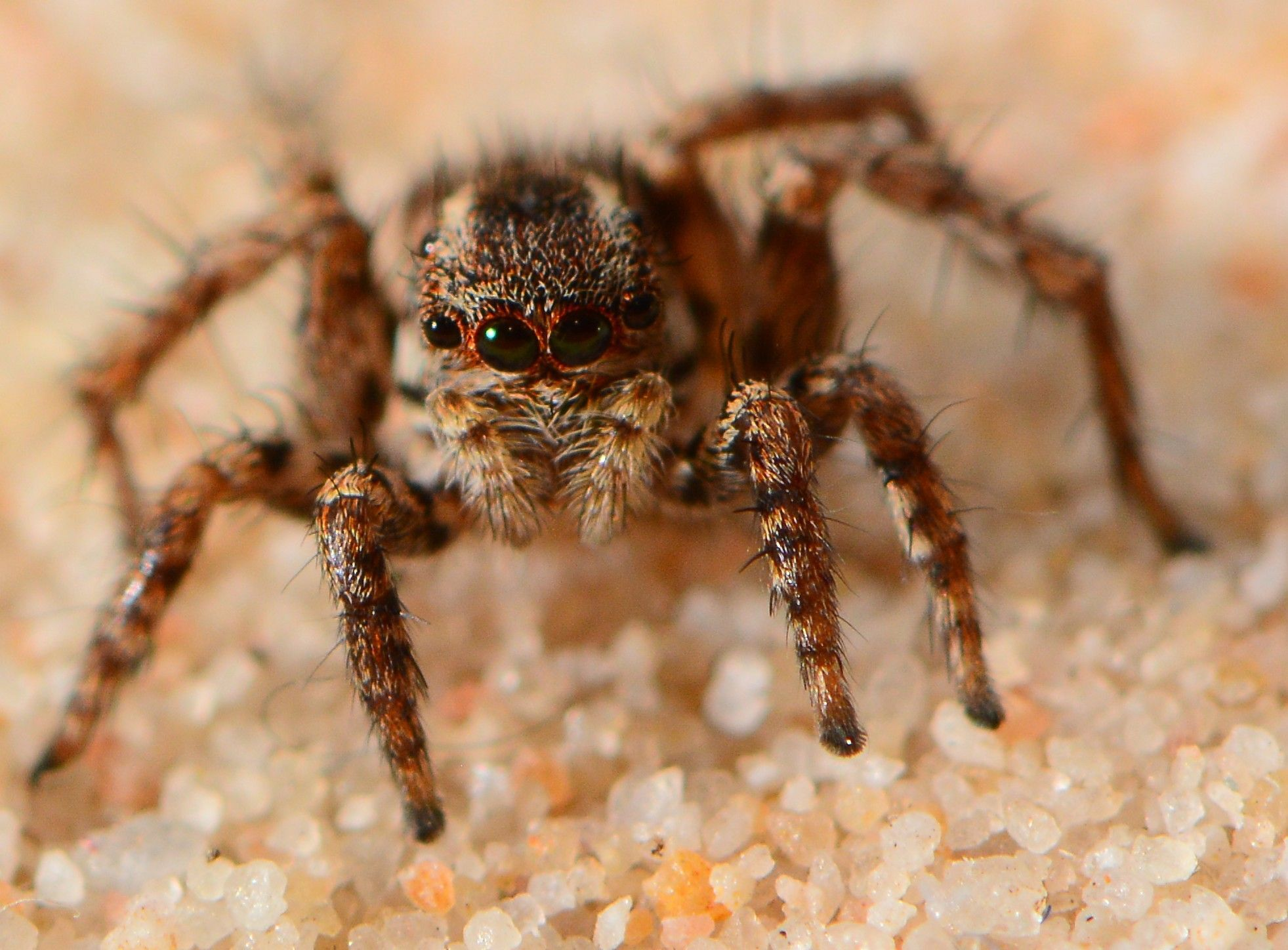
female

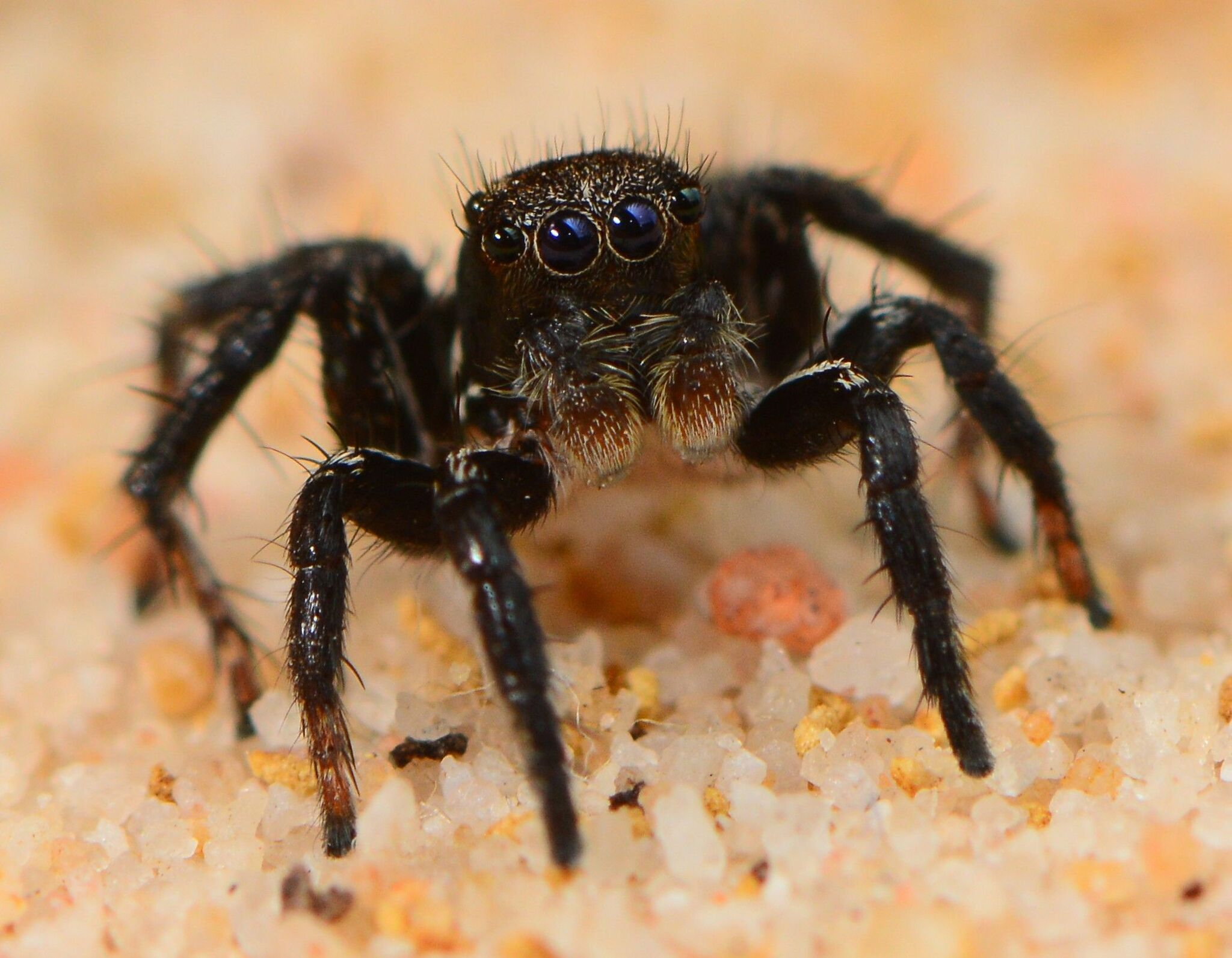
male

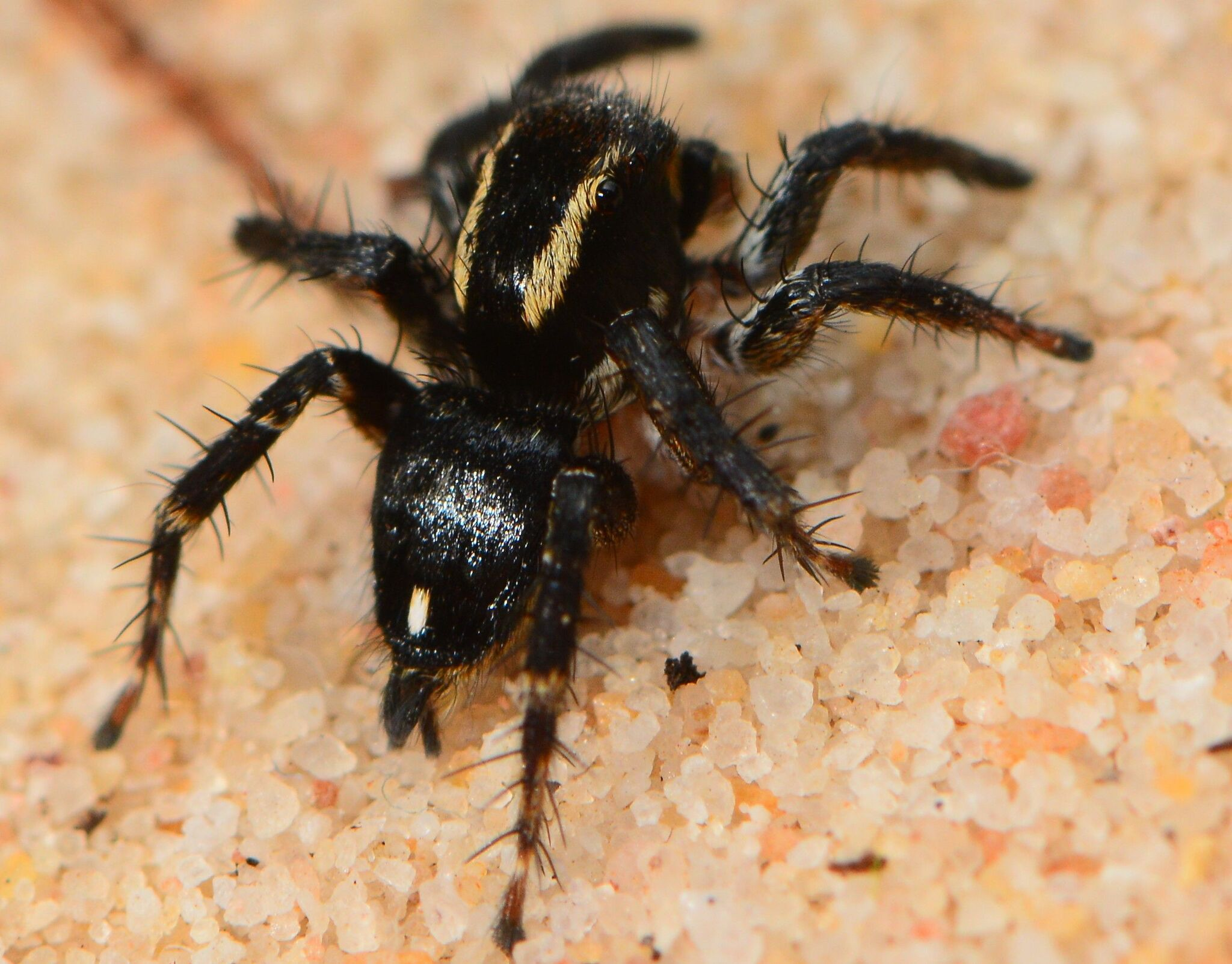
male

The male spider has a pear-shaped brown or dark brown carapace that is covered in scales that is typically between 2.0 and 2.5 mm (0.079 and 0.098 in) long and 1.4 and 1.9 mm (0.055 and 0.075 in) wide. It is marked with two stripes made of white hairs that travel from front to back and, sometimes, two more that cross from side to side, and has a black eye field. The abdomen is shorter and wider, between 1.8 and 2.5 mm (0.071 and 0.098 in) long and between 1.35 and 2.0 mm (0.053 and 0.079 in) wide, and either brown or dark brown and covered in scales. It has a pattern that consists of a white stripe and V-shape on the front half and white spots on the rear half, sometimes one spot and sometimes three. Occasionally, the white hairs on the spiders rub off, removing the patterns. The chelicerae and clypeus may be dark brown, brown to dark brown, or yellowish brown to brown. In some examples, a sparse covering of white hairs covers the clypeus. The chelicerae may have a few short white hairs or a dense covering of long white hairs. The front and middle spinnerets are yellow the back ones dark brown. The legs may be yellow, brown or dark brown and the pedipalps are a combination of yellow and brown. The cymbium is a combination of brown and yellow with either brown or white hairs. The spider is distinguished from other members of the genus by its short embolus, shaped like a claw, sitting on a wide round base.

The female is similar in shape to the male but larger. It has a carapace that measures between 2.25 and 2.75 mm (0.089 and 0.108 in) in length and between 1.75 and 2.15 mm (0.069 and 0.085 in) in width and an abdomen that measures between 2.0 and 2.9 mm (0.079 and 0.114 in) in length and between 1.85 and 2.2 mm (0.073 and 0.087 in) in width. The colouration is similar to the male, but sometimes the patterns have less complexity and are less bright. For example, a specimen may have only one stripe and two spots on the abdomen. The eye field is orange-brown and the pedipalps are brown-yellow. The epigyne has a flat plate with widely separated lateral copulatory openings and a deep narrow pocket. Although it is similar to Stenaelurillus furcatus, it can be distinguished by the narrowness of the epigyne pocket and the way that the insemination ducts are spaced apart.

== Behaviour ==
The spider has primarily been found in sandy environments, but has been observed thriving in swamps and on plants. The species is a specialist hunter and preys on different types of termites, including members of the genera Macrotermes and Odontotermes. The spider also feeds on other prey like fruit flies and leafhoppers. The spider captures its prey by a process of grasping, holding, and injecting its captured prey with venom. It produces a specialised venom that is dedicated for its prey, unlike other species which produce more general-purpose venom. It shares a similar environment to Stenaelurillus modestus, but the two species do not seem to compete for food or space. Stenaelurillus guttiger has also been found foraging along with other termite-eating spiders like Habrocestum africanum and Langelurillus squamiger.

== Distribution ==
Stenaelurillus guttiger has one of the most extensive ranges of the genus, stretching across southern Africa. It was first identified in Makapansgat and Pretoria in South Africa. It has subsequently been found across the country, with examples coming from the provinces of Gauteng, KwaZulu-Natal, Limpopo, Mpumalanga and North West. It has been identified in Francistown, Botswana, initially from examples collected in 2006, as well as in Manicaland and Tsholotsho in Zimbabwe. It has also been found in Manica, Mozambique. The holotype is from Ndumo Game Reserve in KwaZulu-Natal.
