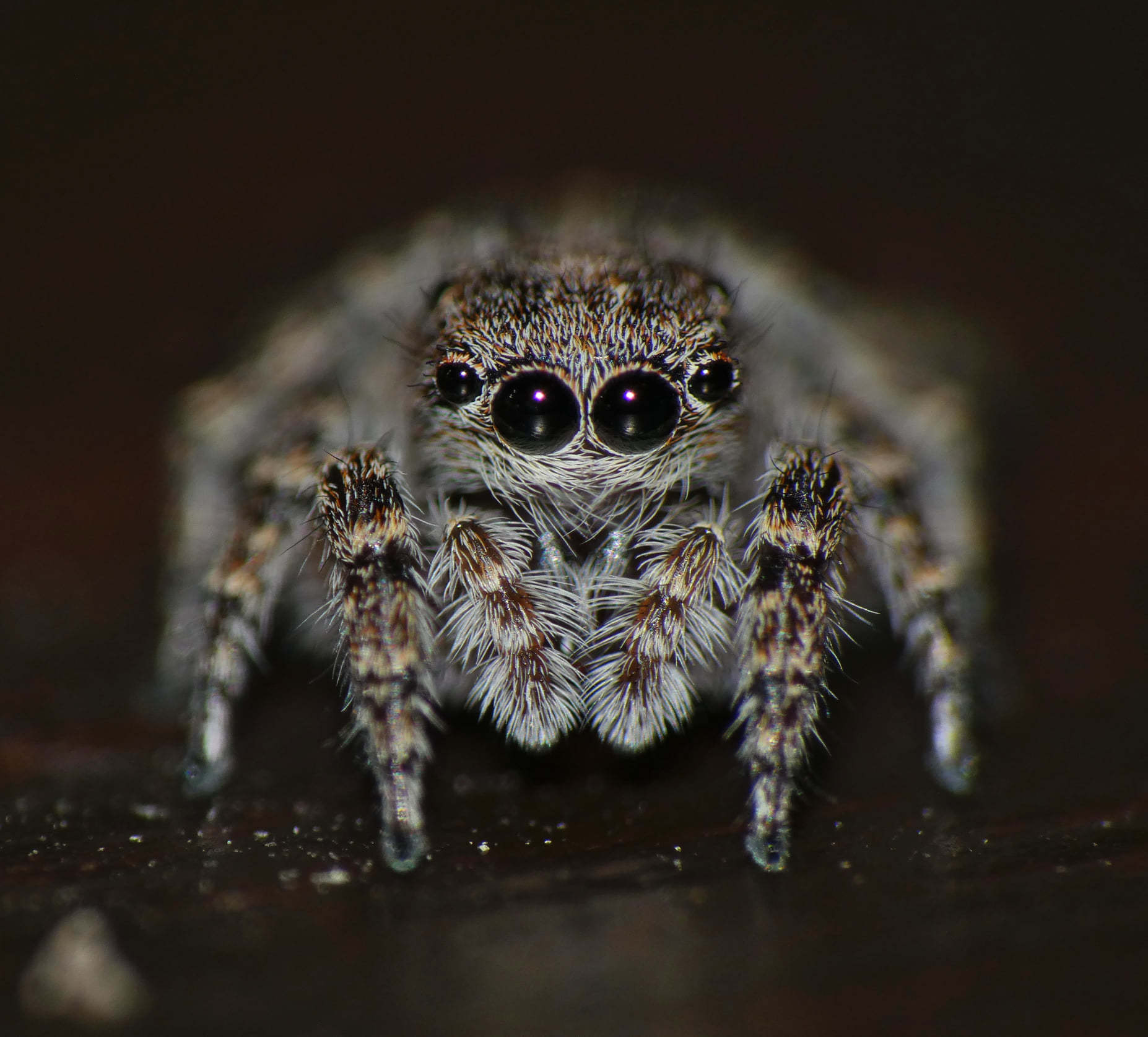
- A spider of the Langelurillus genus

Scientific classification
- Kingdom: Animalia
- Phylum: Arthropoda
- Subphylum: Chelicerata
- Class: Arachnida
- Order: Araneae
- Infraorder: Araneomorphae
- Family: Salticidae
- Genus: Langelurillus
- Species: L. sibandai

Binomial name
- Langelurillus sibandai Wesołowska, 2011

= Langelurillus sibandai =

Species of spider

Langelurillus sibandai is the largest species of jumping spider in the genus Langelurillus. It lives in Zimbabwe. The female was first described in 2011 by Wanda Wesołowska. The male has not been identified. The spider has a large fawn abdomen that is between 6.9 and 7.1 mm (0.27 and 0.28 in) long and a brown cephalothorax between 4.7 and 5.7 mm (0.19 and 0.22 in) long. The distinctive bulgy shape of the abdomen helps to distinguish the species, as well as its size. It has short brownish-orange legs and a large triangular epigyne with two small gonopores.

== Taxonomy ==
Langelurillus sibandai is a jumping spider that was first described by the Polish arachnologist Wanda Wesołowska in 2011. It was one of over 500 species that she identified during her career, making her one of the most prolific amongst all in her discipline. She allocated it to the genus Langelurillus, which had been raised by Maciej Próchniewicz in 1994. However, it exact relationship is unknown as the male has not been described. The genus is related to Aelurillus and Langona but the spiders are generally smaller and, unlike these genera and Phlegra, they lack the parallel stripes on the back of the body that is feature of the majority of these spiders. In 2015, Wayne Maddison placed the genus in the subtribe Aelurillina, which also contained Aelurillus, Langona and Phlegra, in the tribe Aelurillini, within the subclade Saltafresia in the clade Salticoida. In 2016, Jerzy Prószyński placed the same genera in a group named Aelurillines based on the shape of the spiders' copulatory organs.

== Description ==
Langelurillus sibandai is the largest species in the genus. The female has a cephalothorax that has a length between 4.7 and 5.7 mm (0.19 and 0.22 in) and a width of typically 4.3 mm (0.17 in). It has a brown oval and moderately high carapace that is marked by two white streaks on the thorax. The short black eye field has two white patches in its middle and the clypeus has light hairs and a white line at the bottom of the middle eyes. The chelicerae is large, brownish-orange and toothless. The labium is generally orange. The abdomen is larger than the carapace, between 6.9 and 7.1 mm (0.27 and 0.28 in) long and 6.1 and 7.0 mm (0.24 and 0.28 in) wide. It is bulgy and fawn, with a pattern of ten light spots in pairs on its back. The underside is whitish-yellow. The spinnerets are also fawn and the short legs are brownish-orange, with thin brown hairs and short spines. The spider has a large epigyne of a triangular shape, with two small gonopores. The receptacles are spherical, complex and multi-chambered. Apart from its size and the dumpy shape of its body, it can be identified by the large chamber in the seminal ducts. The male has not been described.

== Distribution ==
Almost all, if not all, Langelurillus spiders live in sub-Saharan Africa. Langelurillus sibandai is endemic to Zimbabwe. It has been found in the southwest of the country. The first example was discovered by Lucas Masenga Sibanda, after whom the species is named, in Tsholotsho in 1999.
