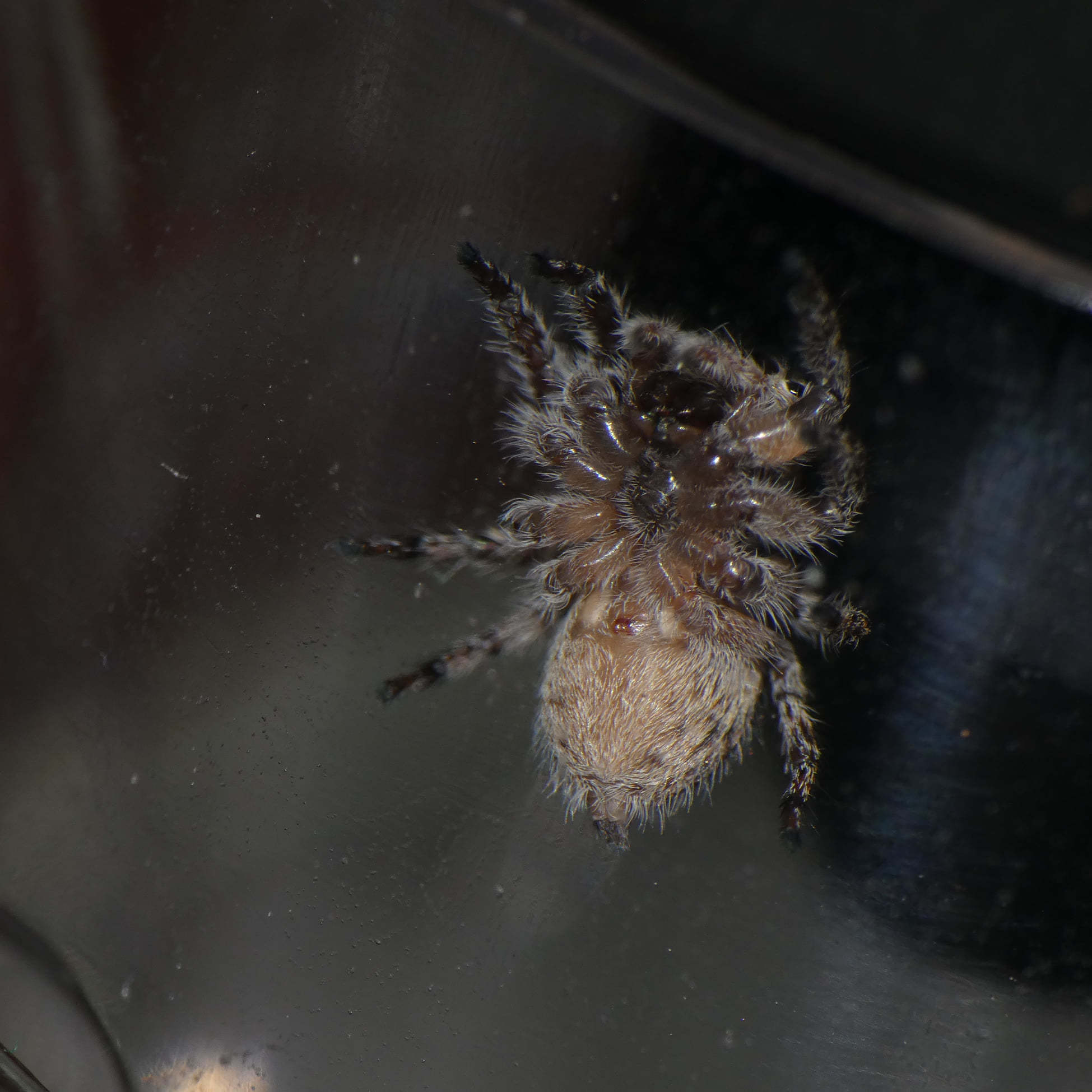
- A spider of the Langelurillus genus

Scientific classification
- Kingdom: Animalia
- Phylum: Arthropoda
- Subphylum: Chelicerata
- Class: Arachnida
- Order: Araneae
- Infraorder: Araneomorphae
- Family: Salticidae
- Genus: Langelurillus
- Species: L. rufus

Binomial name
- Langelurillus rufus (Lessert, 1925)

= Langelurillus rufus =

Species of spider

Langelurillus rufus is a species of jumping spider in the genus Langelurillus that lives in Ethiopia, Kenya and Tanzania. The male was originally described by Roger de Lessert in 1925 and named Langona rufa while male and female samples were named Langelurillus difficilis by Wanda Wesołowska and Anthony Russell-Smith in 2000. The species were combined with the current name in 2012. The spider is small, with a brown carapace that is between 1.9 and 2.0 mm (0.075 and 0.079 in) long and an abdomen between 19 and 2.4 mm (0.748 and 0.094 in) long. The female can be identified by the orange patches on its carapace. The spider has an abdominal pattern that helps distinguish the species from the related Langelurillus manifestus, which has a brown design on a yellowish abdomen with a brown design while Langelurillus rufus has a yellow design on a brown abdomen.

== Taxonomy ==
Langona rufa is a jumping spider that was first described by Roger de Lessert in 1925. He allocated the species to the genus Langona, first identified by Eugène Simon in 1901. Initially, only the female was described. In 2000, Wanda Wesołowska and Anthony Russell-Smith described both male and female examples of a new species that they named Langelurillus difficilis. They allocated the species to the genus Langelurillus, raised by Maciej Próchniewicz in 1994. Species in Langelurillus are related to Langona but the spiders are smaller and, unlike Langona, Aelurillus and Phlegra, they lack the parallel stripes on the back of the body that is feature of the majority of these spiders.

In 2012, Wesołowska realised that the two species described the same spider. She declared that Langelurillus difficilis a junior synonym of Langona rufa and so combined them into Langelurillus rufus, allocating it to the genus Langelurillus on the basis of the spider's small prolateral apophysis on its tegulum. In 2015, Wayne Maddison placed the genus in the subtribe Aelurillina, which also contains Aelurillus, Langona and Phlegra, in the tribe Aelurillini, within the subclade Saltafresia in the clade Salticoida. In 2016, Jerzy Prószyński placed the same genera in a group named Aelurillines based on the shape of the spiders' copulatory organs.

== Description ==
Langelurillus rufus is a small spider, typical of the genus. The male has a carapace that is between 2.0 and 2.1 mm (0.079 and 0.083 in) long and between 1.6 and 1.7 mm (0.063 and 0.067 in) wide. It is dark brown and high, covered in golden shiny hairs, with a short black eye field. The clypeus has light hairs. The chelicerae are brown with two very small teeth to the front. The labium and maxillae are brown. The abdomen is an elongated oval between 1.9 and 2.4 mm (0.075 and 0.094 in) long and typically 1.8 mm (0.071 in) wide. One example had a lighter greyish-orange abdomen, but the majority are darker, almost black, with a pattern of indistinct light dots, although the underside is lighter than the top. It is covered with long dense dark hairs. The forward spinnerets are lighter than those towards the rear. The spider has short brownish-orange legs that have darker dots on some of the surfaces. The copulatory organs are distinctive. The pedipalp is dark with three tibial apophyses, or spikes. There is a suggestion of an apophysis on the edge of tegulum that has the appearance of teeth. The ventral apophysis is shaped a bit like a shovel. The embolus is hidden behind a shield.

The female is similar in size to the male, with a high carapace between 1.9 and 2.0 mm (0.075 and 0.079 in) in length and 1.5 and 1.6 mm (0.059 and 0.063 in) in width, and an abdomen measuring between 2.1 and 2.2 mm (0.083 and 0.087 in) long and typically 1.8 mm (0.071 in) wide. The carapace is similar in shape to the male, but is brown with a pattern of orange patches. It has a covering of short dense, brown and grey hairs. The chelicerae and labium are similarly brown, but the maxillae are orange. The abdomen is more rounded and dumpy and has a covering of short dense brown hairs. It has an irregular yellow pattern on a brown background on the top while the underside is light yellow. All the spinnerets are light, and the legs have brown rings on them. The pedipalp is also light. The spider has an oval epigyne with two depressions towards the back and a pocket near the epigastric furrow. The seminal ducts are very long and coiled. The internal morphology is more complex than other members of the genus.

The spider is very similar to the related Langelurillus manifestus, but can be identified by its smaller size, the fact that it is darker, and its narrower palpal bulb. Particularly noticeable is that the Langelurillus manifestus has a yellowish abdomen with a brown design while Langelurillus rufus has a brown abdomen with a yellowish design. The male is similar to Langelurillus orbicularis, but can be distinguished by the shape of the retrolateral tibial apophysis. It can also be confused with Langona magna but is smaller and lacks the spines on the feet of the other species.

== Distribution and habitat ==
Almost all, if not all, Langelurillus spiders live in sub-Saharan Africa. Langelurillus rufus lives in Ethiopia, Kenya and Tanzania. The male holotype was found in Kibonoto near Mount Kilimanjaro. It has subsequently been found in the Mkomazi Game Reserve. Examples have also been identified in Mackinnon Road, Kenya, and in Ethiopia. It is found in the grasses found in Acacia senegal woodland, or living among similar shrubs like Dichrostachys.
