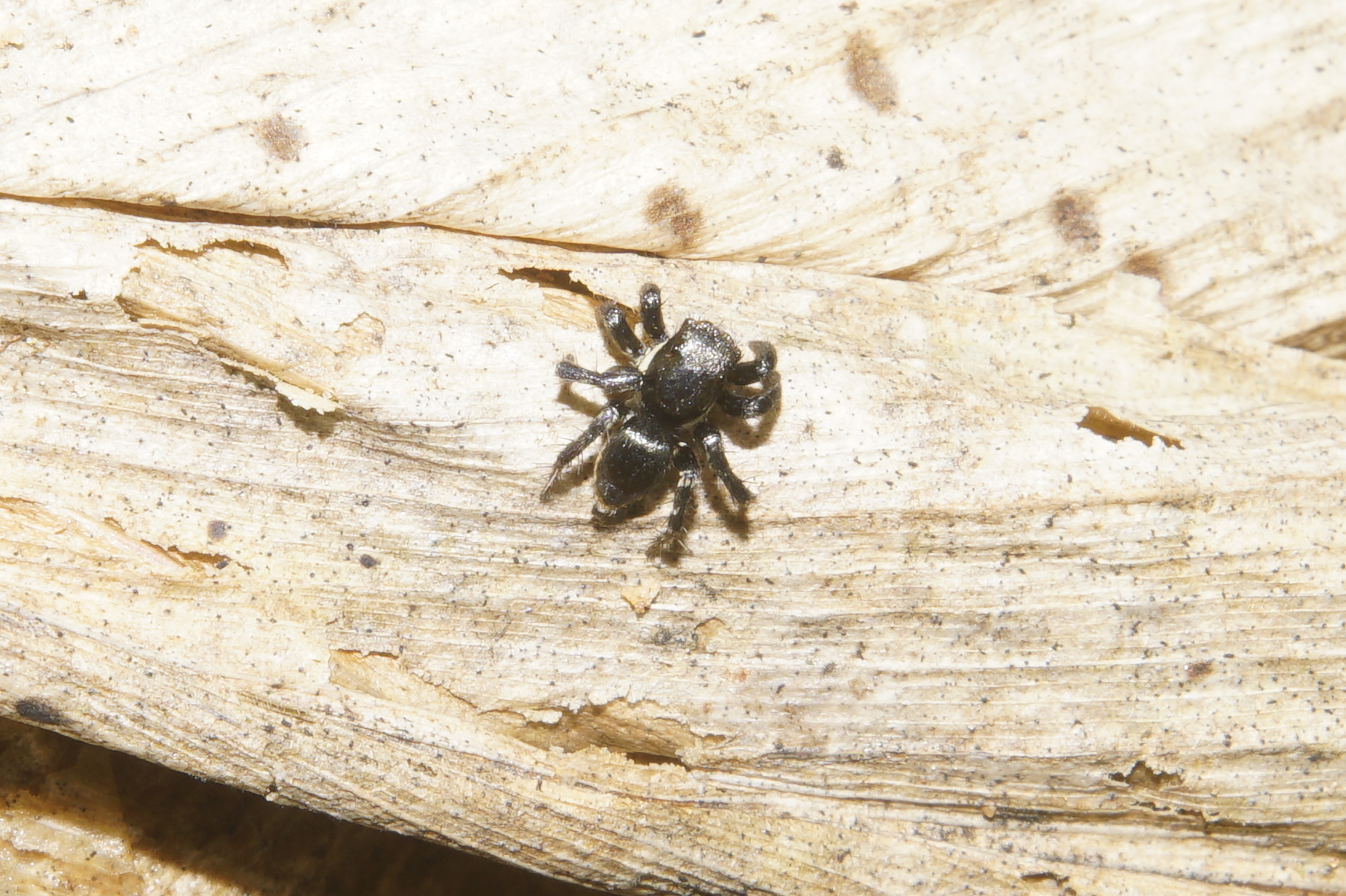
- A spider of the Stenaelurillus genus

Scientific classification
- Kingdom: Animalia
- Phylum: Arthropoda
- Subphylum: Chelicerata
- Class: Arachnida
- Order: Araneae
- Infraorder: Araneomorphae
- Family: Salticidae
- Genus: Stenaelurillus
- Species: S. albopunctatus

Binomial name
- Stenaelurillus albopunctatus Caporiacco, 1949

= Stenaelurillus albopunctatus =

Species of spider

Stenaelurillus albopunctatus is a species of jumping spider in the genus Stenaelurillus that lives in Kenya. The spider is medium-sized, with a cephalothorax between 2.24 and 23.55 mm (0.088 and 0.927 in) long and abdomen between 2.38 and 3.92 mm (0.094 and 0.154 in) long. It has two white stripes on its carapace and white speckles or spots on its abdomen. The female is generally lighter than the male. For example, the female has a brown and yellow carapace, which in the male is brown or black. The female clypeus and legs are yellow, while on the male they are brown. Otherwise, the colouration is similar to many other species in the genus. It is this similarity that led to the species Stenaelurillus guttiger being recognised as a member of the genus. The male has a spatula-like appendage at the front of its yellow pedipalps and a short thick embolus. The female has copulatory openings positioned very closely together and short insemination ducts. It was first described in 1949 by Ludovico di Caporiacco.

== Taxonomy and etymology ==
Stenaelurillus albopunctatus is a species of jumping spider, a member of the family Salticidae, that was first described by Ludovico di Caporiacco in 1949. It was placed in the genus Stenaelurillus, first circumscribed by Eugène Simon in 1886. The genus name relates to the genus name Aelurillus, which itself derives from the Greek word for cat, with the addition of a Greek stem meaning narrow. The species name derives from two Latin words, albus, meaning white, and punctatus, a word that can be translated spotted or speckled. The genus was placed in the subtribe Aelurillina in the tribe Aelurillini by Wayne Maddison in 2015, who listed the tribe in the clade Saltafresia. Two years later, in 2017, it was grouped with nine other genera of jumping spiders under the name Aelurillines by Jerzy Prószyński.

== Description ==
The spider is medium-sized. The male has a cephalothorax that measures between 2.24 and 2.65 mm (0.088 and 0.104 in) in length and between 1.54 and 2.0 mm (0.061 and 0.079 in) in width. It has a brown or black oval carapace, the hard upper part of the cephalothorax, with two wide stripes from the eye field to the back and two more along the edges. The eye field is black and has dense bristles. Its sternum, or underside of the cephalothorax, is orange-brown, as are its mouthparts, including its labium and maxillae. Its chelicerae are light brown and have small teeth while its clypeus is brown with colourless hairs. In some examples, the spider's sternum, chelicerae, labium and maxillae are yellow and its clypeus is brownish-yellow. In this case, the sternum has a covering of white hairs.

The male has a brown abdomen that is shaped like a shield, between 2.38 and 2.7 mm (0.094 and 0.106 in) long and between 1.76 and 1.9 mm (0.069 and 0.075 in) wide. It is brown, with a brown scutum covering much of the front, in some cases two thirds of the total, and white spots or speckles towards the back. Its spinnerets are long and yellow with black tips, legs brown and pedipalps yellow. Its pedipalps have an appendage reminiscent of a spatula at the front and massive appendage behind. The spider's tegulum is so small that it is nearly invisible. Its palpal bulb is broad and has a short thick embolus that has a base shaped like an anvil. The embolus has an end that is shaped like a hook.

The female is similar to the male in shape but overall slightly larger. The cephalothorax is between 2.9 and 3.55 mm (0.114 and 0.140 in) long and between 2 and 2.49 mm (0.079 and 0.098 in) wide and the abdomen has a length of between 2.9 and 3.92 in (74 and 100 mm) and width of between 2.3 and 2.36 mm (0.091 and 0.093 in). The colouring is similar to the male but lighter. The carapace is yellow and brown, and the eye field brown. The abdomen is yellow, with brown scales, and is marked with a faded stripe as well as brown speckles. The spider has light brown spinnerets, while the chelicerae and clypeus are yellow with a slight brown shade and the pedipalps are yellow. The epigyne, the external visible part of the female's copulatory organ, is flat and lacks a pocket, which is unusual amongst spiders in the genus. It has two ovoid copulatory openings positioned very closely together, short insemination ducts and large bean-like spermathecae.

The spider can be confused with other species in the genus, particularly in the colouration on the carapace. For example, it was the similarity between the pattern with Stenaelurillus guttiger that led to Clark moving that species into the same genus. However, it can be distinguished by its sexual organs. For example, it differs from Stenaelurillus leucogrammus in the shorter posterior lobe of the palpal bulb on the male and narrower copulatory openings on the female. The spider can be distinguished from the similar Stenaelurillus kronestedti, with which is shares the shape of its embolus shape, by the shapes of the appendage at the front of the male pedipalp and the black bristles on the appendage at the back and the female's shorter insemination ducts.

== Distribution and habitat ==
The species is endemic to Kenya. It was first identified in Nairobi in 1944 and Elmenteita in 1945, with both male and female examples found. One of these, a male from Nairobi, was designated the lectotype in 2018. The species has also been found in Naivasha. The species lives in a wide range of rural environments, including grassland and swamps that are dominated by Sesbania trees.
