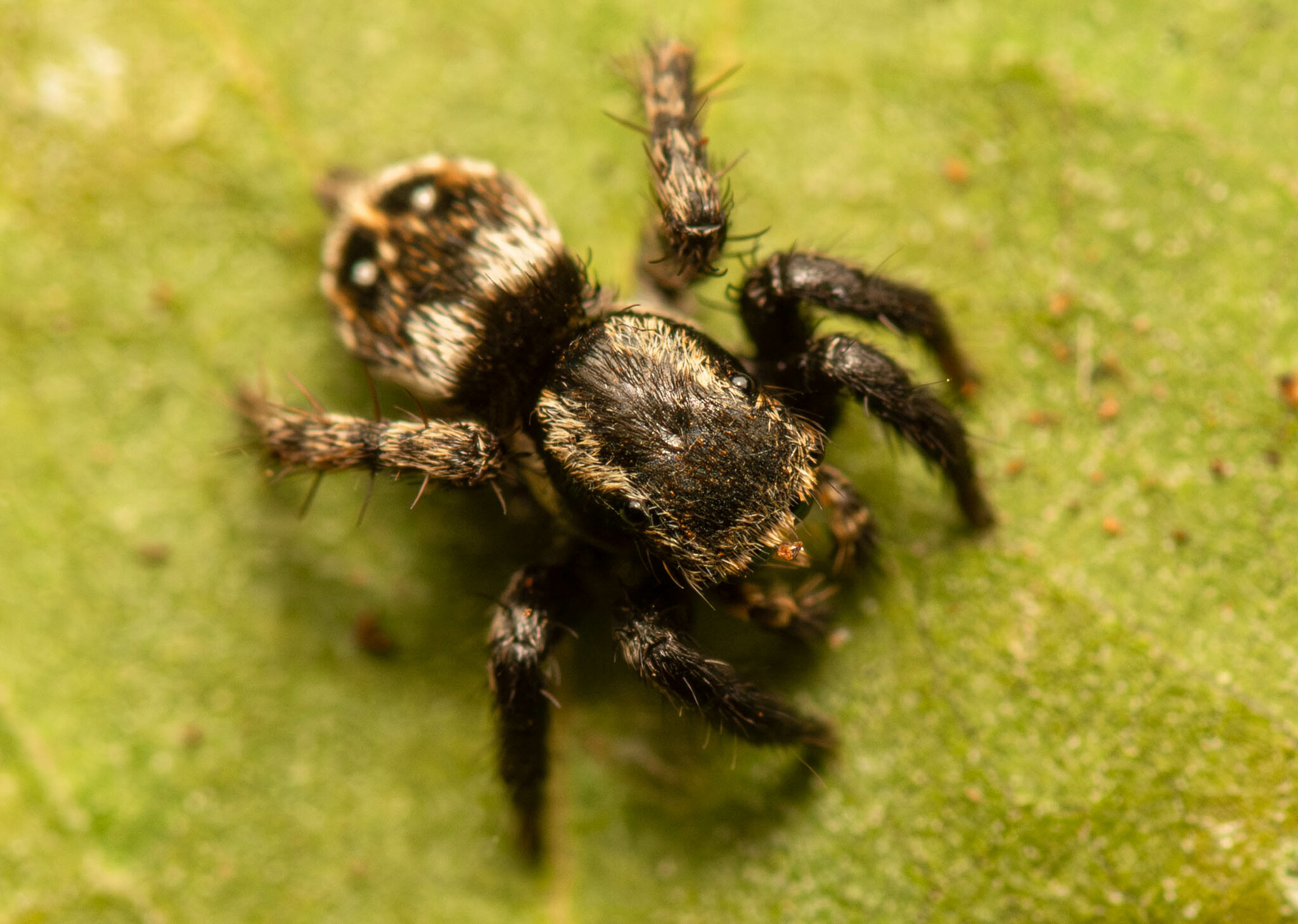
- female
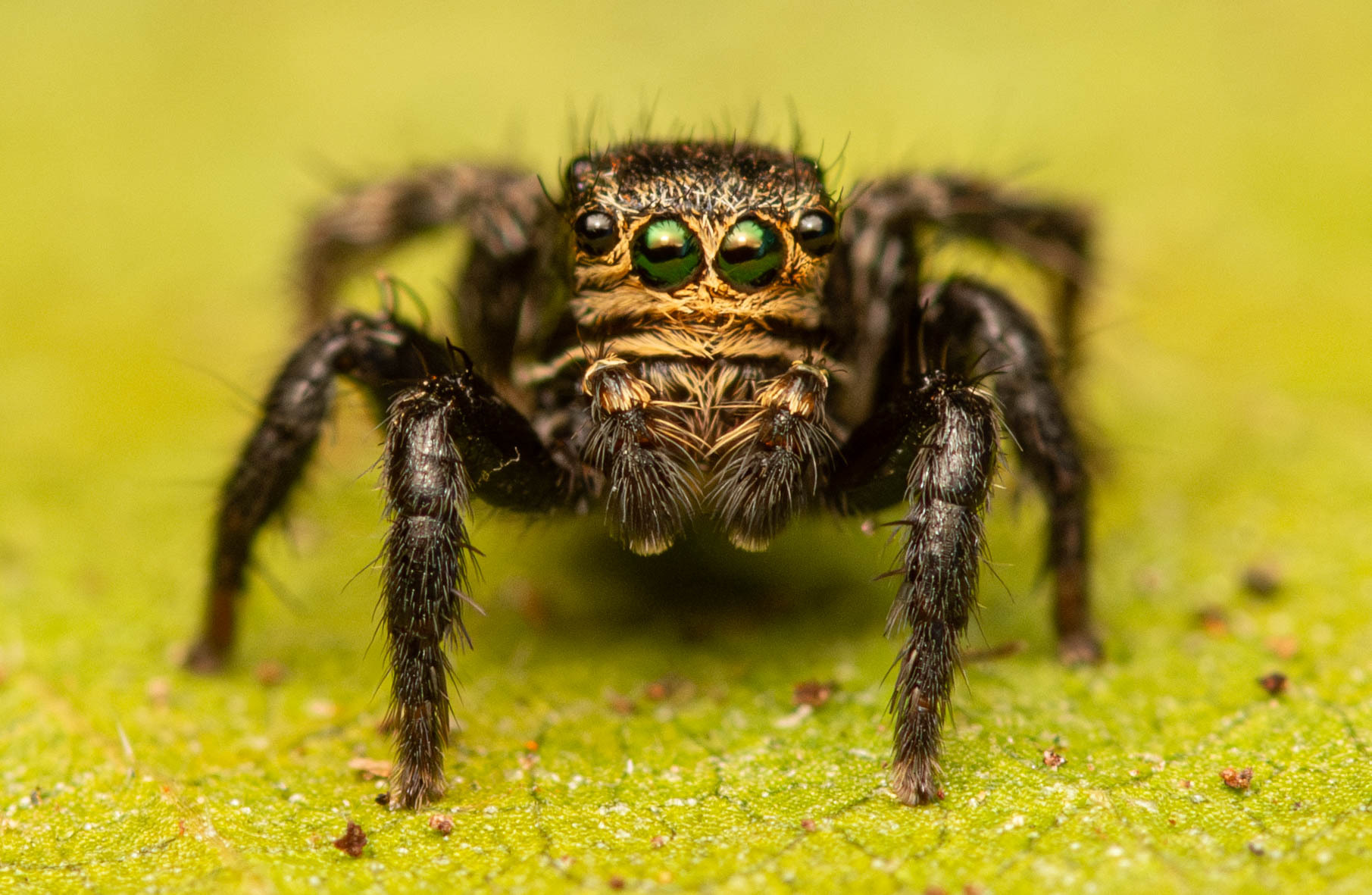
- female

Scientific classification
- Kingdom: Animalia
- Phylum: Arthropoda
- Subphylum: Chelicerata
- Class: Arachnida
- Order: Araneae
- Infraorder: Araneomorphae
- Family: Salticidae
- Genus: Stenaelurillus
- Species: S. modestus

Binomial name
- Stenaelurillus modestus Wesołowska, 2014

= Stenaelurillus modestus =

Species of spider

Stenaelurillus modestus is a species of jumping spider in the genus Stenaelurillus that lives in South Africa. The species is a specialist that preys on Odontotermes termites, although its venom is also effective against other prey. The spider is medium-sized, with a brown cephalothorax between 2.0 and 2.7 mm (0.079 and 0.106 in) in length and a black abdomen between 1.9 and 2.8 mm (0.075 and 0.110 in) long. It is generally black or dark brown in colour. The carapace has a border of white hairs and the abdomen is edged with bristles. The male has white patches on its abdomen. The male has darker legs, generally dark brown or black, while the female has brownish-yellow legs. It is distinguished from other members of the genus by the male's elongated palpal bulb and straight embolus, and the horseshoe-shaped depression in the female's epigyne. It was first described in 2014 by Wanda Wesołowska.

== Taxonomy and etymology ==
Stenaelurillus modestus is a species of jumping spider, a member of the family Salticidae, that was first described by the Polish arachnologist Wanda Wesołowska in 2014. It is one of over 500 species identified by Wesołowska during her career. She placed it in the genus Stenaelurillus, which had been first circumscribed by Eugène Simon in 1886. The name relates to the genus name Aelurillus, which itself derives from the Greek word for 'cat', with the addition of a Greek stem meaning 'narrow'. The specific name is a Latin word that can be translated 'modest'. Wayne Maddison placed the genus in the subtribe Aelurillina in the tribe Aelurillini in his 2015 study of spider phylogenetic classification, which was allocated to the clade Saltafresia. In 2017, Jerzy Prószyński grouped it with nine other genera of jumping spiders under the name Aelurillines.

== Description ==
The spider is medium-sized. The spider's body is divided into two main parts: a rather rounded almost rectangular cephalothorax and more pointed and ovoid abdomen. The male has a cephalothorax that measures between 2.0 and 2.4 mm (0.079 and 0.094 in) in length and between 1.5 and 1.9 mm (0.059 and 0.075 in) in width. The spider's carapace, the hard upper part of the cephalothorax, is a black oval that is covered in dense dark hairs. It has a border of white hairs on the edge and two white streaks that stretch from eye field back. The underside of the cephalothorax, or sternum, is yellow-brown. The clypeus and cheeks are brown, crossed with two stripes of white hairs and narrow stripes of white hairs on the sides. The spider's mouthparts, including the chelicerae, labium and maxillae, are brown. Dark brown hairs cover the chelicerae.

The spider's abdomen is shaped like a shield, black with large white patches. Some specimens have a pattern of six large pale yellow spots in two rows and two white patches in the middle. It is between 1.9 and 2.3 mm (0.075 and 0.091 in) long and 1.8 and 1.9 mm (0.071 and 0.075 in) wide. It has long bristles on its edge. The spinnerets are black or yellow and brown. The legs are dark brown or brown. The pedipalps are also brown. The spider has distinctive male copulatory organs. It has a dark brown cymbium that is covered in dark hairs. The palpal bulb is elongated and has a pointed projection to its base and another to the top. The thin embolus projects from inside and loops around to run straight along the bulb. There is a pointed projection, or apophysis, on the palpal tibia. It can be distinguished from other members of the genus by its elongated palpal bulb, and straight embolus. Its embolus resembles that in species of the genus Phlegra.

The female is very similar to the male in colouration and shape. It is slightly larger, with a cephalothorax between 2.6 and 2.7 mm (0.10 and 0.11 in) long and 1.8 and 1.9 mm (0.071 and 0.075 in) wide and an abdomen between 2.6 and 3.4 in (66 and 86 mm) long and 2.2 and 2.8 mm (0.087 and 0.110 in) wide. It has a brown carapace with two lines of white scales running down it. The eye field is dark brown. The sternum is brown-yellow, as is the labium. Its clypeus and cheeks are light brown and have a scattering of light brown hairs on them. The spinnerets, legs and pedipalps are all brownish-yellow. Some specimens have brown legs with blackish rings on them. The abdomen lacks the white patch that is found on the male. In some specimens, the underside is mottled.

The female copulatory organs are distinctive. The epigyne as an ovoid plate on it and a deep pocket in a deep notch along its back edge. There are two copulatory openings that are spaced far from each other that lead to short insemination ducts and bean-like spermathecae. It is distinguishable from other species by the presence of a horseshoe-shaped depression in the epigyne and the particular path of the insemination ducts. The notch at the edge of the epigynal plate is also characteristic.

== Behaviour ==
The species is a specialist hunter and preys on termites in the genus Odontotermes. The spider captures its prey by a process of grasping and holding, injecting its capture with venom. Despite the spider being a specialist hunter, the venom is equally effective against other prey. It has been seen to attack and eat other species, including those of the order Isopoda like Porcellio scaber and Reticulitermes santonensis and both adults and larvae of flies like Drosophila hydei. It has been found living alongside other termite-eating species like Habrocestum africanum, Langelurillus squamiger and Stenaelurillus guttiger.

== Distribution and habitat ==
The distribution is endemic to South Africa. The holotype was identified in the Ndumo Game Reserve in KwaZulu-Natal based on a specimen collected in 2012. It prefers areas of leaf litter in broadleaf woodlands.
