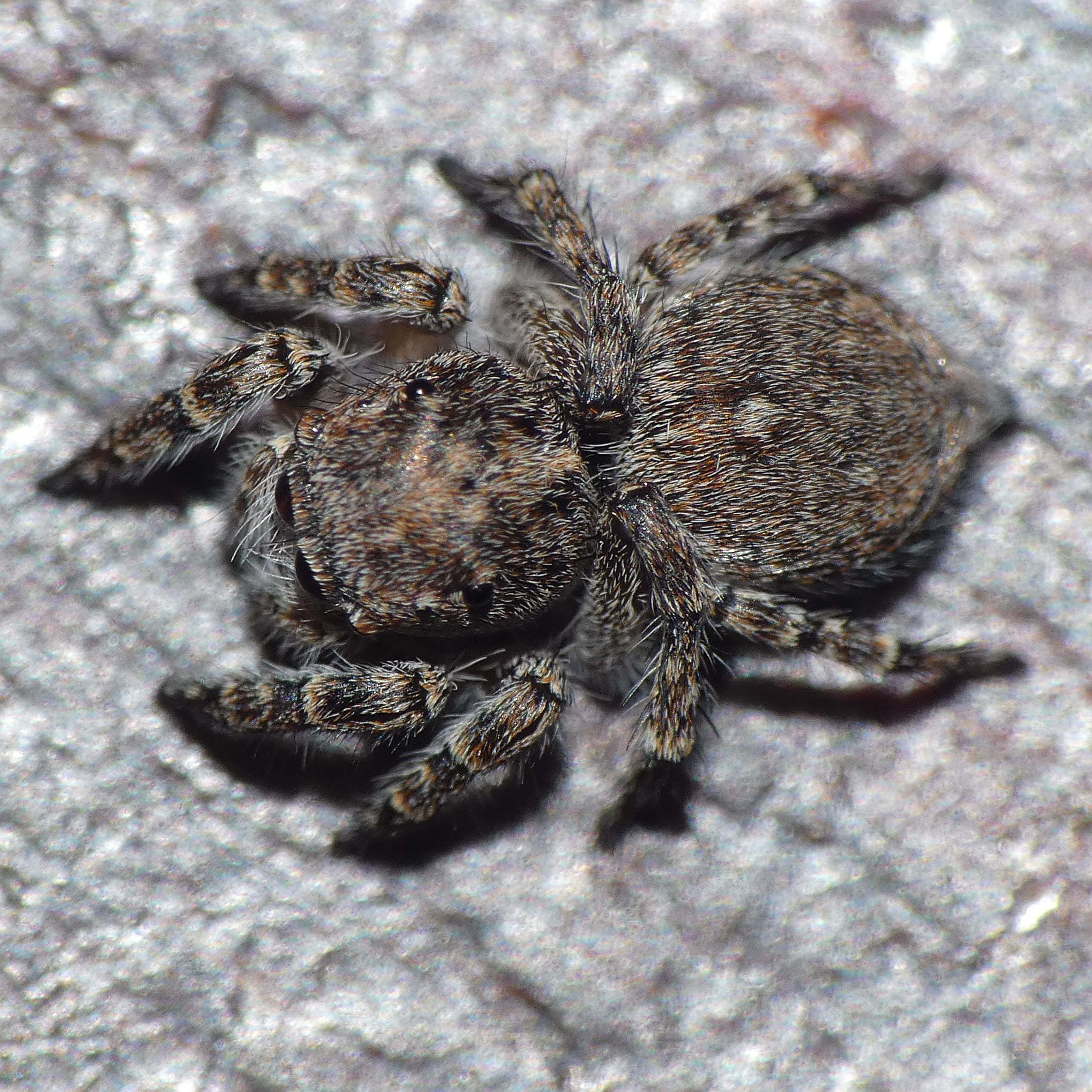
- L. namibicus
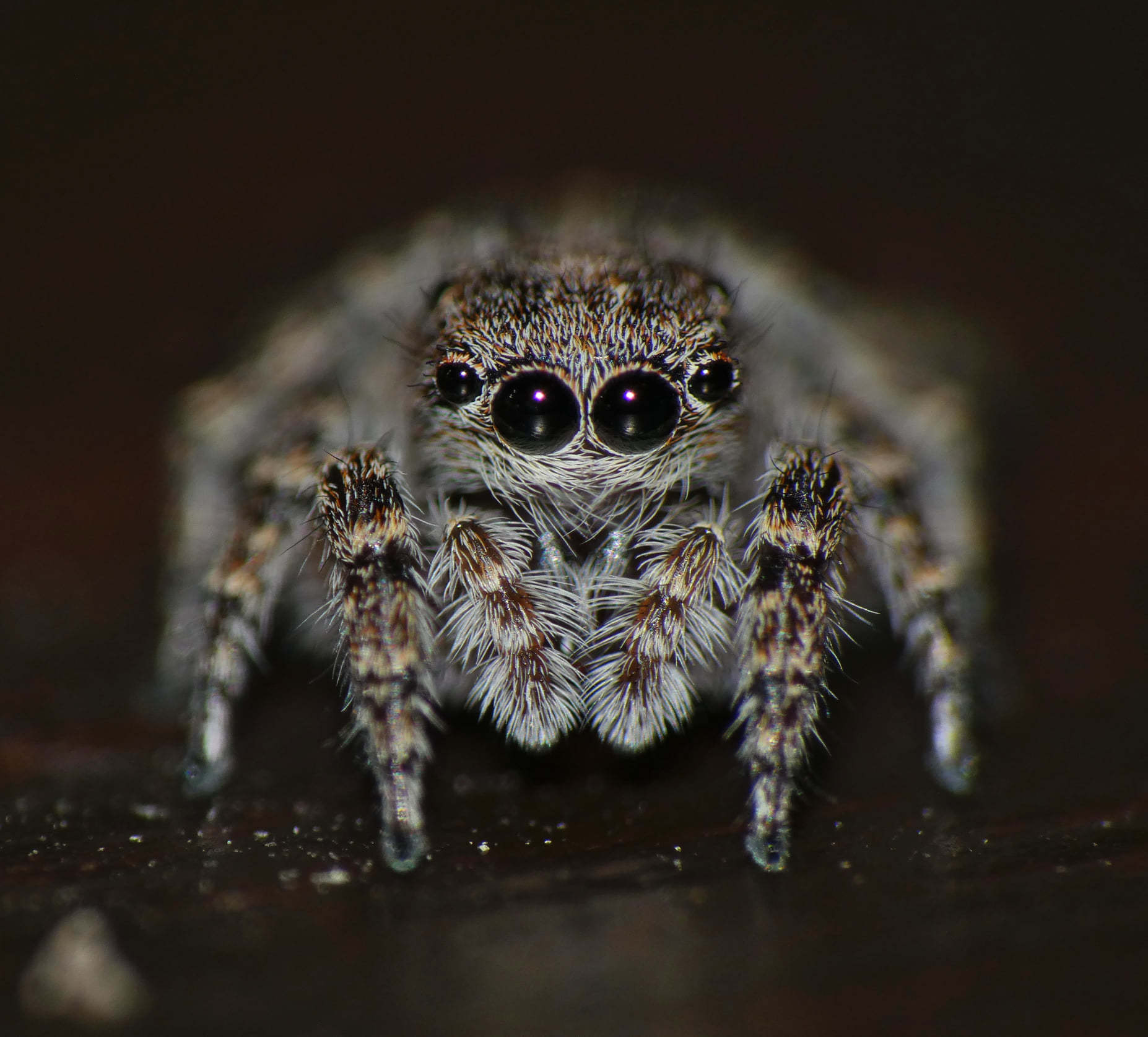
- L. namibicus

Scientific classification
- Kingdom: Animalia
- Phylum: Arthropoda
- Subphylum: Chelicerata
- Class: Arachnida
- Order: Araneae
- Infraorder: Araneomorphae
- Family: Salticidae
- Subfamily: Salticinae
- Genus: Langelurillus; Próchniewicz, 1994

Type species
- Langelurillus primus Próchniewicz, 1994

Diversity
- 22 species

= Langelurillus =

Genus of spiders

Langelurillus is a spider genus of the family Salticidae (jumping spiders). All the described species occur only in Africa.

== Species ==
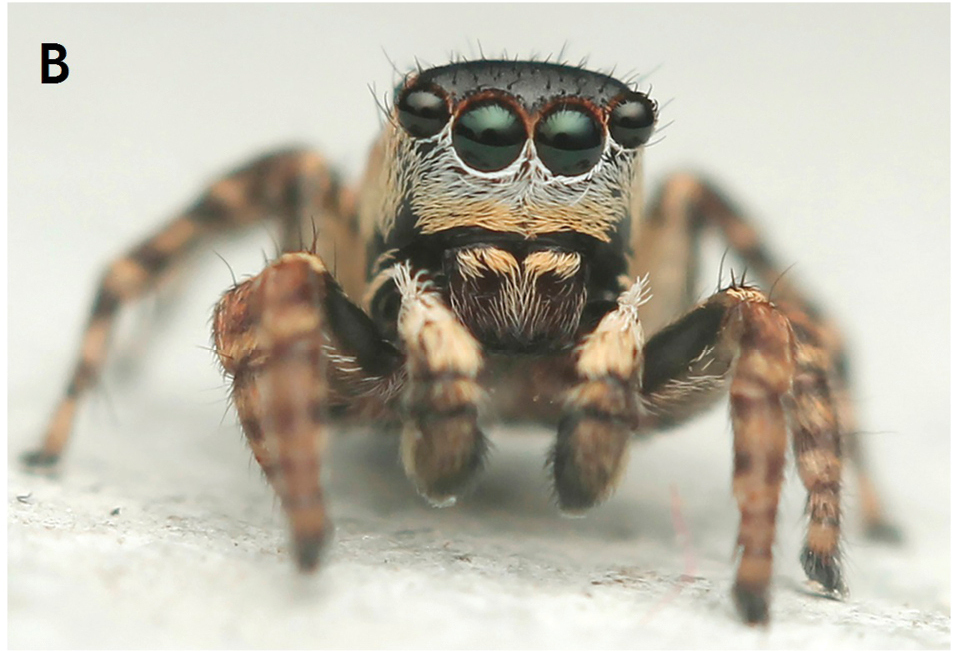
male L. tertius

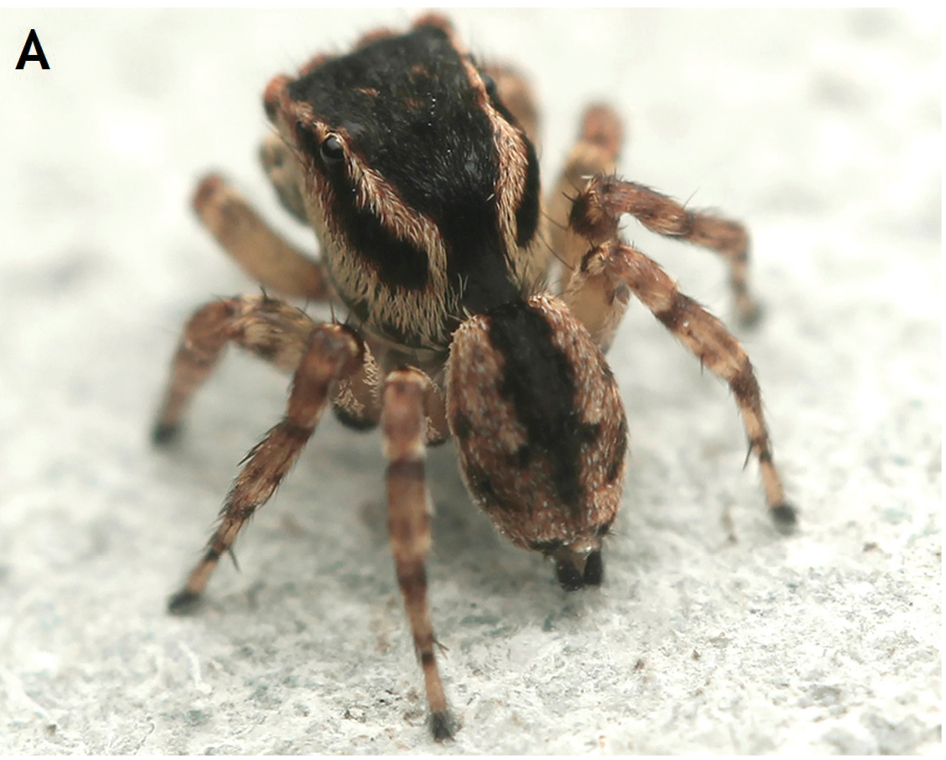
male L. tertius

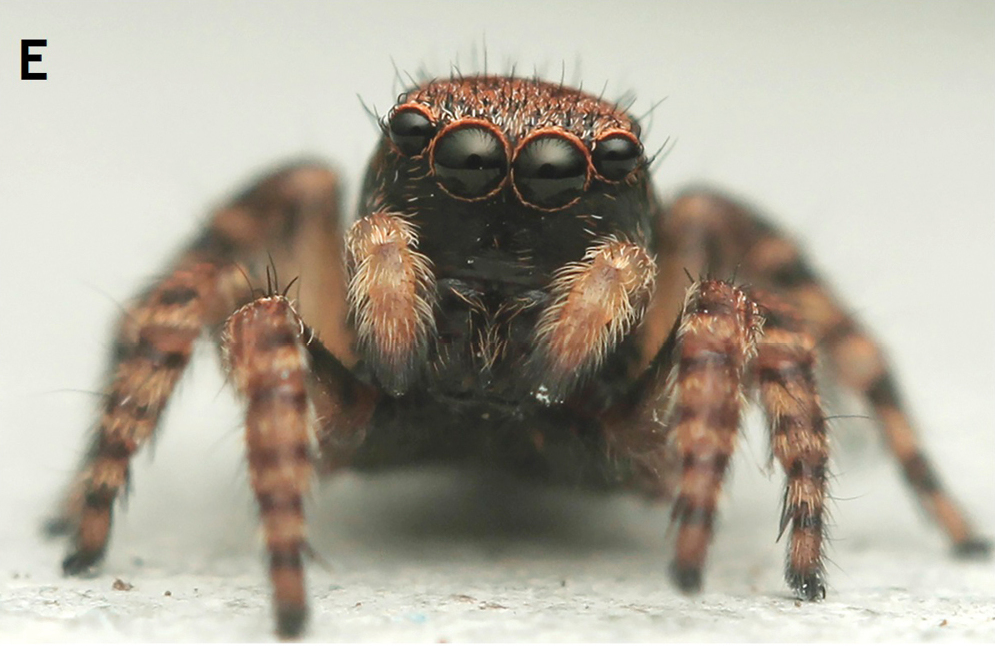
female L. tertius

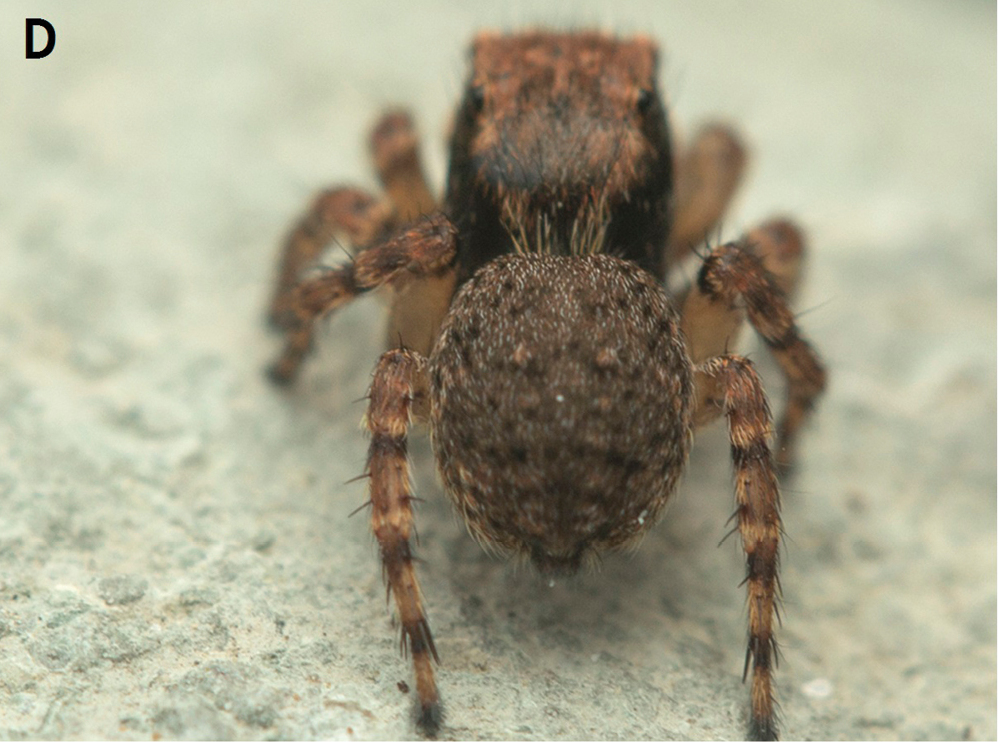
female L. tertius

As of October 2025, this genus includes 23 species:

- Langelurillus alboguttatus Wesołowska & Russell-Smith, 2000 – Tanzania
- Langelurillus alius Haddad, Wiśniewski & Wesołowska, 2024 – Mozambique
- Langelurillus cedarbergensis Haddad & Wesołowska, 2013 – South Africa
- Langelurillus furcatus Wesołowska & Russell-Smith, 2000 – Kenya, Tanzania
- Langelurillus holmi Próchniewicz, 1994 – Kenya
- Langelurillus horrifer Rollard & Wesołowska, 2002 – Guinea
- Langelurillus ignorabilis Wesołowska & Cumming, 2008 – Zimbabwe, Mozambique
- Langelurillus krugeri Wesołowska & Haddad, 2013 – South Africa
- Langelurillus lacteus Sanap, Joglekar & Caleb, 2017 – India
- Langelurillus manifestus Wesołowska & Russell-Smith, 2000 – Tanzania
- Langelurillus minutus Wesołowska & Cumming, 2011 – Namibia, Zimbabwe, Mozambique
- Langelurillus namibicus Wesołowska, 2011 – Namibia, South Africa
- Langelurillus nigritus (Berland & Millot, 1941) – Guinea, Ivory Coast, Ghana, Nigeria
- Langelurillus onyx Caleb, Sanap, Joglekar & Prajapati, 2017 – India
- Langelurillus orbicularis Wesołowska & Cumming, 2008 – Uganda, Zimbabwe, Mozambique
- Langelurillus primus Próchniewicz, 1994 – Kenya (type species)
- Langelurillus pusillus Haddad, Wiśniewski & Wesołowska, 2024 – Mozambique
- Langelurillus quadrimaculatus Wesołowska & Russell-Smith, 2011 – Guinea, Ghana, Nigeria
- Langelurillus rufus (Lessert, 1925) – Ethiopia, Tanzania
- Langelurillus sibandai Wesołowska, 2011 – Zimbabwe
- Langelurillus spinosus Próchniewicz, 1994 – Kenya
- Langelurillus squamiger Wesołowska & Haddad, 2018 – South Africa
- Langelurillus tertius Sanap & Caleb, 2022 – India
