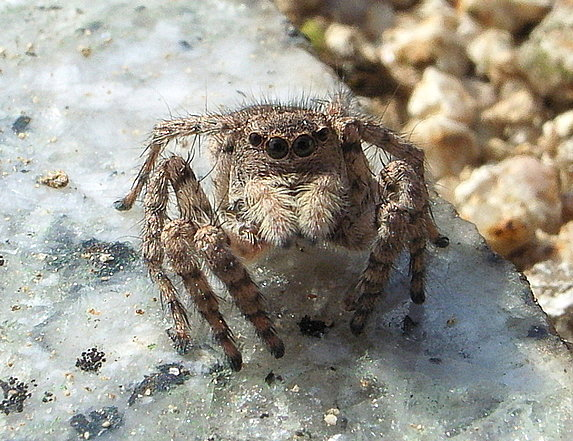
- A. festivus from Japan

Scientific classification
- Kingdom: Animalia
- Phylum: Arthropoda
- Subphylum: Chelicerata
- Class: Arachnida
- Order: Araneae
- Infraorder: Araneomorphae
- Family: Salticidae
- Subfamily: Salticinae
- Genus: Asianellus; Logunov & Heciak, 1996

Type species
- A. festivus (C. L. Koch, 1834)

Species
- 5, see text

= Asianellus =

Genus of spiders

Asianellus is a genus of jumping spiders that was first described by D. V. Logunov & S. Hęciak in 1996.

== Species ==
As of June 2019 it contains five species, found only in Asia and Europe:

- Asianellus festivus (C. L. Koch, 1834) (type) – Europe, Caucasus, Russia (Europe to Far East), Kazakhstan, China, Korea, Japan
- Asianellus kazakhstanicus Logunov & Hęciak, 1996 – Kazakhstan, Russia (West Siberia), China
- Asianellus kuraicus Logunov & Marusik, 2000 – Russia (South Siberia)
- Asianellus ontchalaan Logunov & Hęciak, 1996 – Russia (Urals, South Siberia)
- Asianellus potanini (Schenkel, 1963) – Armenia to China
