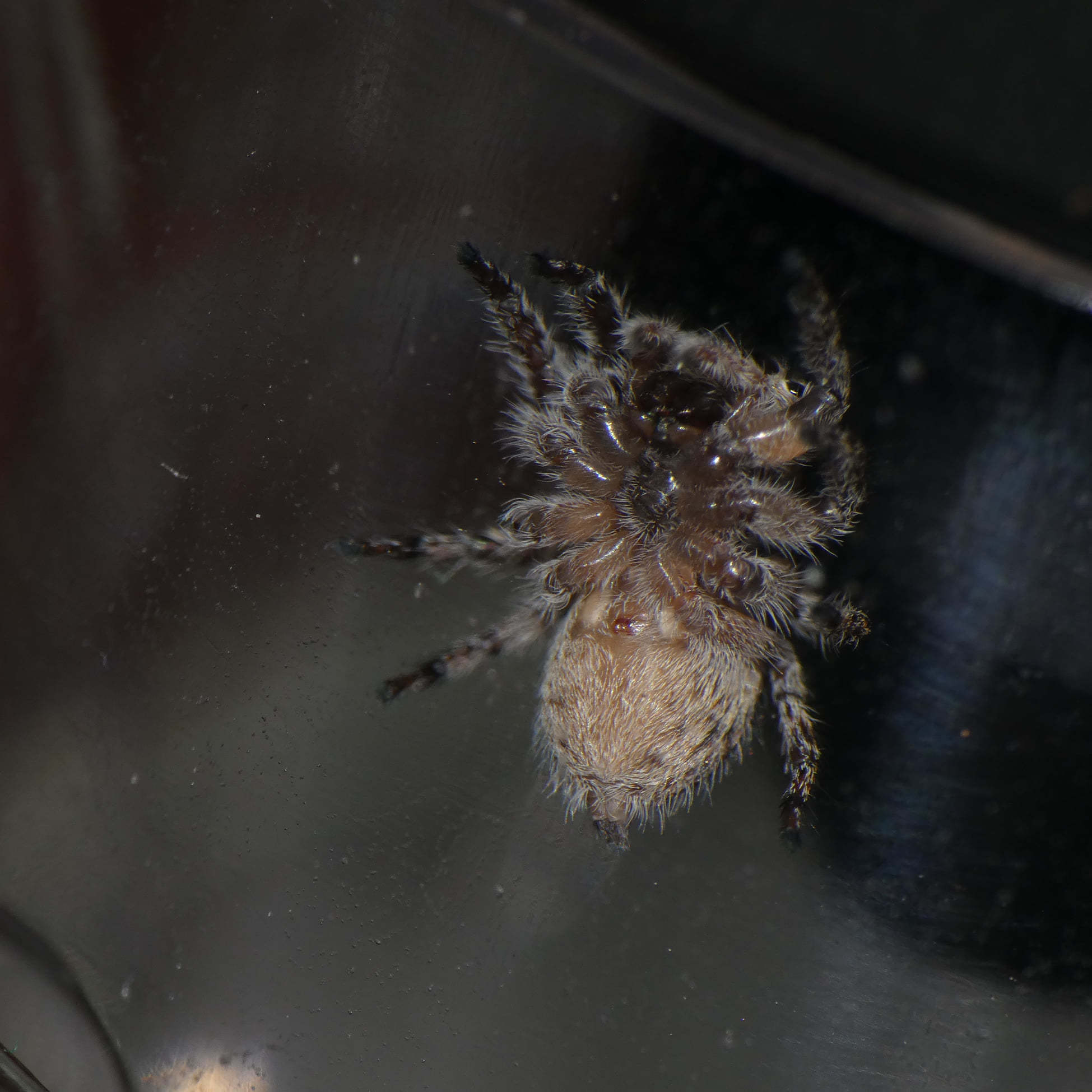
- A spider of the Langelurillus genus

Scientific classification
- Kingdom: Animalia
- Phylum: Arthropoda
- Subphylum: Chelicerata
- Class: Arachnida
- Order: Araneae
- Infraorder: Araneomorphae
- Family: Salticidae
- Genus: Langelurillus
- Species: L. orbicularis

Binomial name
- Langelurillus orbicularis Wesołowska & Cumming, 2008

= Langelurillus orbicularis =

Species of spider

Langelurillus orbicularis is a species of jumping spider in the genus Langelurillus that lives in Zimbabwe. The species was first described in 2008 by Wanda Wesołowska and Meg Cumming. The spider is small with a distinctively rounded grey abdomen between 1.4 and 3.6 mm (0.055 and 0.142 in) long and a dark brown carapace between 1.7 and 2.4 mm (0.067 and 0.094 in) long. The species is named for the rounded abdomen. The female is larger than the male and has a mottled abdomen that has a ladder-like pattern made up of six spots. It is similar to others in its genus, but differs in the design of the copulatory organs. The male has a distinctive tibial apophysis made up of three horns and the female has wide seminal ducts that make a characteristic shape.

== Taxonomy ==
Langelurillus orbicularis is a jumping spider that was first described by Wanda Wesołowska and Meg Cumming in 2008. It was one of over 500 species identified by the Polish arachnologist Wesołowska during her career. They allocated it to the genus Langelurillus, which had been raised by Maciej Próchniewicz in 1994. The genus is related to Aelurillus and Langona but the spiders are smaller and, unlike these genera and Phlegra, they lack the parallel stripes on the back of the body that is feature of the majority of these spiders. In 2015, Wayne Maddison placed the genus in the subtribe Aelurillina, which also contained Aelurillus, Langona and Phlegra, in the tribe Aelurillini, within the subclade Saltafresia in the clade Salticoida. In 2016, Jerzy Prószyński placed the same genera in a group named Aelurillines based on the shape of the spiders' copulatory organs. The species is named after a Latin word that means rounded.

== Description ==
Langelurillus orbicularis is a small spider. The male has a very high carapace that has a length of between 1.7 and 1.9 mm (0.067 and 0.075 in) and a width of between 1.4 and 1.5 mm (0.055 and 0.059 in). It is light brown and covered in short grey hairs with a short eye field. The clypeus is brown and of medium height. The chelicerae are yellowish brown with a blue metallic sheen and toothless, while the labium and other mouthparts are light brown. The rounded abdomen is distinctive, as recalled in the species name. It is between 1.4 and 1.6 mm (0.055 and 0.063 in) long and 1.2 and 1.3 mm (0.047 and 0.051 in) wide, grey and covered in grey hairs. The spinnerets are yellow and black and the relatively short legs are yellowish-brown, with brown hairs and spines. The pedipalps are hairy and dark brown to black. The spider has a very convex palpal bulb with tooth-like tegular apophysis on the edge of the tegulum. The embolus is coiled into a spiral at the tip of the bulb. The embolus is hidden behind a shield. The male has a distinctive tibial apophysis, or appendage, with one horn having two prongs, one larger than the other, and another topped with what seems to be a mat of short dense hairs.

The female is generally larger to the male. The carapace is between 2.1 and 2.4 mm (0.083 and 0.094 in) long and 1.6 and 1.9 mm (0.063 and 0.075 in) wide and the abdomen measures between 1.9 and 3.6 mm (0.075 and 0.142 in) long and 1.7 and 3.2 mm (0.067 and 0.126 in) wide. It has similar colours, although the thorax is lighter and the abdomen is mottled with a ladder-like pattern made of three pairs of white spots. There are two teeth in the chelicerae. The spider has an oval epigyne with two rounded depressions and wide seminal ducts leading to spherical receptacles.

The species has similarities to others in the genus, particularly Langelurillus difficilis and Langelurillus manifestus, but have distinctive copulatory organs, especially the shape of the male's tibial apophysis and the female's seminal ducts.

== Distribution and habitat ==
Almost all, if not all, Langelurillus spiders live in sub-Saharan Africa. Langelurillus orbicularis is endemic to Zimbabwe. The holotype was discovered in 1999. It lives in and around leaf litter in shady damp places, under trees, bushes and walls.
