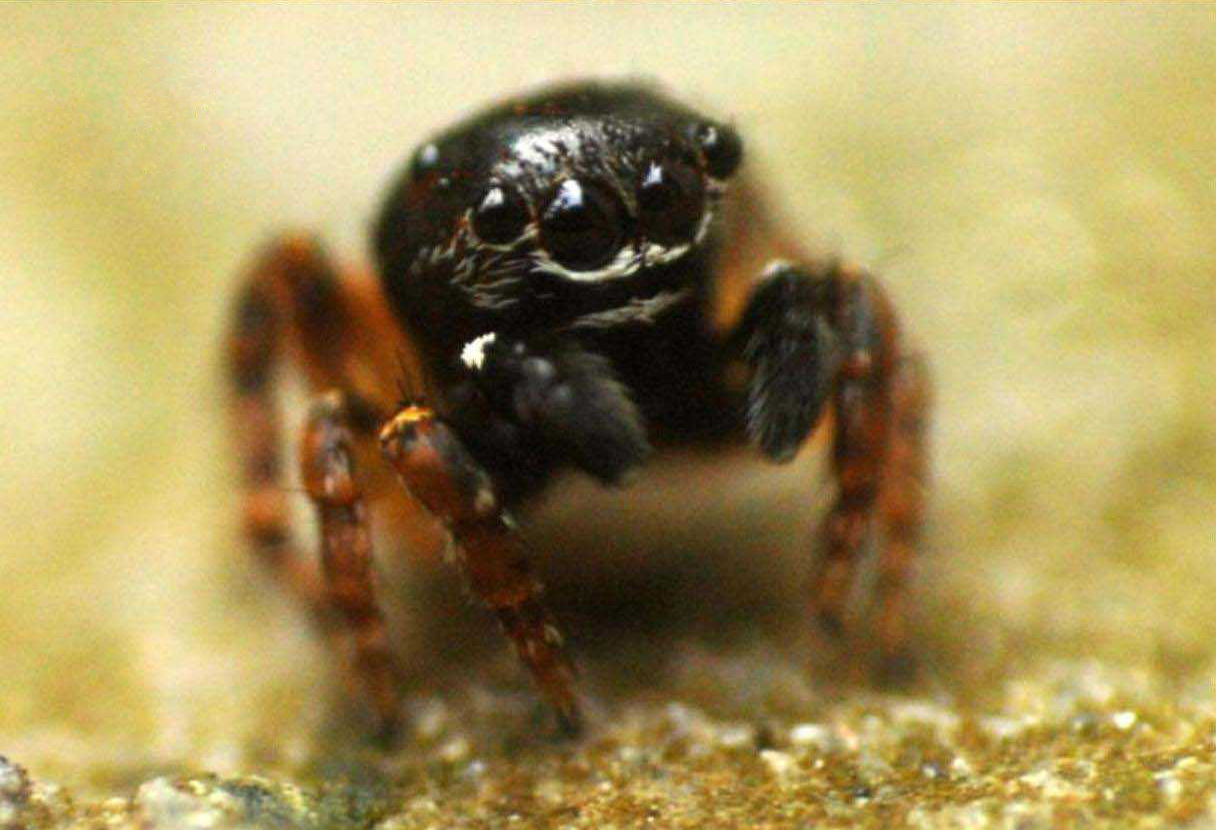
- male Phanuelus gladstone

Scientific classification
- Kingdom: Animalia
- Phylum: Arthropoda
- Subphylum: Chelicerata
- Class: Arachnida
- Order: Araneae
- Infraorder: Araneomorphae
- Family: Salticidae
- Subfamily: Salticinae
- Genus: Phanuelus; Caleb & Mathai, 2015
- Species: P. gladstone

Binomial name
- Phanuelus gladstone Caleb & Mathai, 2015

= Phanuelus =

Genus of spiders

Phanuelus is a spider genus of the jumping spider family, Salticidae. The single described species Phanuelus gladstone is endemic to India. The holotype and paratypes of P. gladstone were all collected from the campus of Madras Christian College in Chennai. Adult spiders are 3–4 mm in length with a short, high carapace and rounded abdomen.

The genus is named after G. J. Phanuel, a professor at Madras Christian College who worked on the spiders of Chennai in the early 1960s.
