= Proszynskiana =

Scientific classification
- Kingdom: Animalia
- Phylum: Arthropoda
- Subphylum: Chelicerata
- Class: Arachnida
- Order: Araneae
- Infraorder: Araneomorphae
- Family: Salticidae
- Subfamily: Salticinae
- Genus: Proszynskiana; Logunov, 1996

Type species
- P. starobogatovi Logunov, 1996

Species
- 7, see text

Genus of spiders

Proszynskiana is a genus of Asian jumping spiders that was first described by D. V. Logunov in 1996. It is named in honor of arachnologist Jerzy Prószyński.

== Taxonomy ==
In Maddison's 2015 classification of the family Salticidae, Proszynskiana is placed in the tribe Aelurillini, part of the Salticoida clade of the subfamily Salticinae.

=== Species ===
As of August 2019 it contains seven species, found in Siberia, Tajikistan, Iran, Turkmenistan, and Uzbekistan:

- Proszynskiana aeluriforma Logunov & Rakov, 1998 – Uzbekistan
- Proszynskiana deserticola Logunov, 1996 – Kazakhstan
- Proszynskiana iranica Logunov, 1996 – Turkmenistan
- Proszynskiana izadii Azarkina & Zamani, 2019 – Iran
- Proszynskiana logunovi Azarkina & Zamani, 2019 – Iran
- Proszynskiana starobogatovi Logunov, 1996 (type) – Tajikistan
- Proszynskiana zonshteini Logunov, 1996 – Turkmenistan
