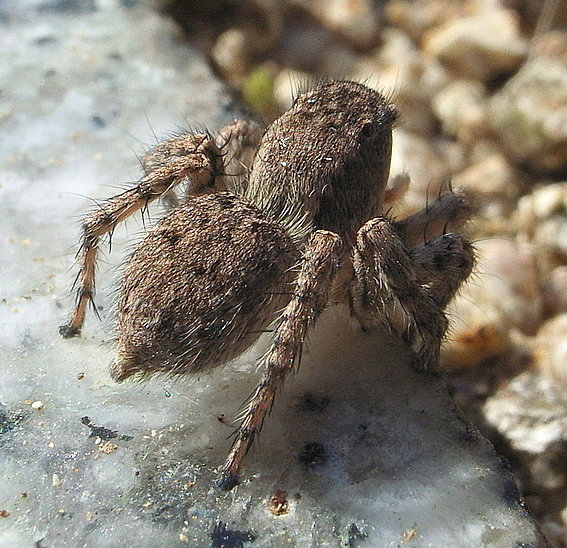
- Asianellus festivus

Scientific classification
- Kingdom: Animalia
- Phylum: Arthropoda
- Subphylum: Chelicerata
- Class: Arachnida
- Order: Araneae
- Infraorder: Araneomorphae
- Family: Salticidae
- Subfamily: Salticinae
- Tribe: Aelurillini
- Subtribe: Aelurillina; Simon, 1901

Genera
- See text.

= Aelurillina =

Subtribe of spiders

Aelurillina is a subtribe of jumping spiders. Nearly all species live in the Old World, except Phlegra hentzi.

== Genera ==
Wayne Maddison in 2015 placed the following genera in the subtribe:

- Aelurillus Simon, 1884
- Asianellus Logunov & Heciak, 1996
- Langelurillus Próchniewicz, 1994
- Langona Simon, 1901
- Mashonarus Wesołowska & Cumming, 2002 – now regarded as a synonym of Stenaelurillus
- Microheros Wesołowska & Cumming, 1999 – now regarded as a synonym of Stenaelurillus
- Phanuelus Caleb & Mathai, 2015
- Phlegra Simon, 1876
- Proszynskiana Logunov, 1996
- Rafalus Prószyński, 1999
- Stenaelurillus Simon, 1886
