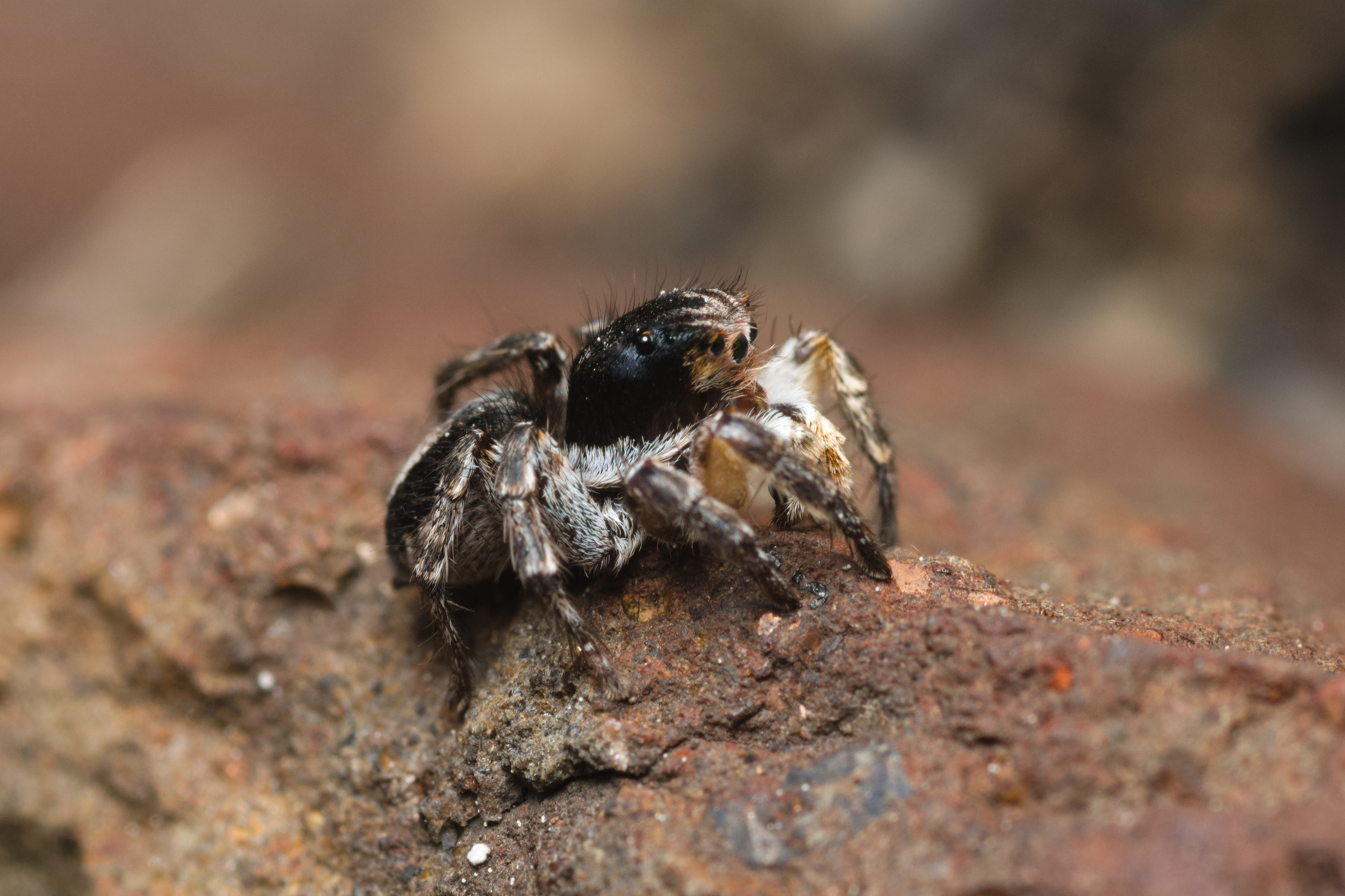
- The related Aelurillus v-insignitus

Scientific classification
- Kingdom: Animalia
- Phylum: Arthropoda
- Subphylum: Chelicerata
- Class: Arachnida
- Order: Araneae
- Infraorder: Araneomorphae
- Family: Salticidae
- Genus: Aelurillus
- Species: A. subaffinis

Binomial name
- Aelurillus subaffinis Caporiacco, 1947

= Aelurillus subaffinis =

Species of spider

Aelurillus subaffinis is a species of jumping spider in the genus Aelurillus that lives in East Africa. It was first described in 1947 by Ludovico di Caporiacco based on a specimen that may have come from Tanzania. Only the female has been described. The spider is small. It has a dark brown carapace that is between 3.1 and 3.2 mm (0.12 and 0.13 in) long and a yellow abdomen that has a length between 2.75 and 3.8 mm (0.108 and 0.150 in). It has brown chelicerae, a brown-yellow clypeus and yellow legs. The epigyne has a low pocket, distinctive shape and sclerotized flaps. It is similar to the related Aelurillus aeruginosus apart from the copulatory organs.

== Taxonomy ==
Aelurillus subaffinis was first described by Ludovico di Caporiacco in 1947. It was placed in the genus Aelurillus, first described by Eugène Simon in 1885. Despite being the second of the genus to be described, 45 years had passed since the naming of Aelurillus cristatopalpus and another 45 passed before the next, Aelurillus minutus. The genus name derives from the Greek word for cat and the species name is derived from the Latin for bulging. The species is related to Aelurillus concolor and Aelurillus conviniens. The genus was placed in the subtribe Aelurillina in the tribe Aelurillini, both named after the genus, by Wayne Maddison in 2015. These were allocated to the clade Saltafresia. In 2017, the genus was grouped with nine other genera of jumping spiders under the name Aelurillines.

== Description ==
Only the female has been described. It is a small spider, with a typical length of 6 mm (0.24 in). The carapace is between 3.1 and 3.2 mm (0.12 and 0.13 in) long and between 2.25 and 2.3 mm (0.089 and 0.091 in) wide and the abdomen is between 2.75 and 3.8 mm (0.108 and 0.150 in) long and between 2.4 and 2.9 mm (0.094 and 0.114 in) wide. The carapace Is dark brown and the abdomen yellow. There is an indistinct pattern on the surface of the abdomen but otherwise the spider is plain. The eye field and chelicerae are brown. The clypeus is brown-yellow and the legs are yellow with spots of grey. Like other species in the genus, it has sclerotized flaps surrounding the epigyne.

The species is similar to the related Aelurillus aeruginosus and to a lesser extent Aelurillus faragallai. It can be distinguished by the copulatory organs. The epigyne has a low pocket and a distinctive shape, as do the spermathecae.

== Distribution ==
Tamás Szűts and Galina Azarkina identified the species distribution as being limited to East Africa. The holotype was collected by Kálmán Kittenberger in 1903. Szűts and Azarkina identified this specimen as coming from Tanzania but were uncertain. They also identified it in Assab in Eritrea. According to the World Spider Catalog, the species is found in Ethiopia.
