= Aelurillus cypriotus =

Scientific classification
- Kingdom: Animalia
- Phylum: Arthropoda
- Subphylum: Chelicerata
- Class: Arachnida
- Order: Araneae
- Infraorder: Araneomorphae
- Family: Salticidae
- Genus: Aelurillus
- Species: A. cypriotus

Binomial name
- Aelurillus cypriotus Azarkina, 2006

Species of jumping spider

Aelurillus cypriotus is a species of jumping spider in the genus Aelurillus that lives in Cyprus, after which it is named. It has been found living in both natural environments and areas of human habitation, including forests of Pinus nigra trees and in a ski resort on Mount Olympus.

It is a small spider with a brown carapace that measures between 1.96 and 2.8 mm (0.077 and 0.110 in) in length and an abdomen that measures between 1.96 and 3 mm (0.077 and 0.118 in) in length. The female is larger than the male. The male has a yellow-grey abdomen, marked with a stripe down the middle. The female abdomen is yellow-brown with an indistinct pattern. It has a row of brown bristles at the base of its face or clypeus.The spider's legs are yellow or yellow-brown, with brown markings. The female copulatory organs include looping insemination ducts that lead to unusually complex spermathecae, or receptacles.

== Taxonomy and etymology ==
Aelurillus cypriotus is a species of jumping spider, a member of the family Salticidae, that was first described by the arachnologist Galina Azarkina in 2006. She allocated the species to the genus Aelurillus, which had been first circumscribed by Eugène Simon in 1885. The genus is named for the Greek word for cat and the species name recalls the place where the species was first found, Cyprus.

The genus Aelurillus was placed in the subtribe Aelurillina in the tribe Aelurillini, both named after the genus, by Wayne Maddison in 2015. These were allocated to the clade Saltafresia. The In 2017, Jerzy Prószyński grouped the genus with nine other genera of jumping spiders under the name Aelurillines. It is closely related to the genus Manzuma and Rafalus, particularly in the shape of its body and the composition of its copulatory organs.

== Description ==
Aelurillus cypriotus is a small spider with a rounded cephalothorax and a spherical abdomen with blackish-brown and white hairs. The male has a carapace, the hard upper shell of the cephalothorax, measures between 1.9 and 2.6 mm (0.075 and 0.102 in) long and between 1.5 mm (0.059 in) and 1.9 mm wide. It is brown covered in white hairs. It has a dark brown eye field that is covered in brownish and white scales and there are yellowish-white hairs near some of the eyes. It has yellow-brown chelicerae, while its mouthparts, including its labium and maxillae, are more brownish-yellow. Its face, including its clypeus and cheeks, is covered in thin transparent-white hairs.

The male's abdomen measures between 1.96 and 2 mm (0.077 and 0.079 in) in length and between 1.3 mm (0.051 in) and 1.9 mm in width. It is yellow-grey with a dark brown topside that is marked with a single broad stripe down the middle. The spider's legs are yellow with brown markings. Its pedipalps have a knob on its femur and a covering of white hairs. Its cymbium is topped with short hairs, The palpal bulb has bulges on the side and a more pointed projection at the bottom. The embolus starts inside the bulb and curls around to project a short distance out of the bulb. The palpal tibia is also bulbous with a short and broad spike, known as its tibial apophysis.

The female has a brown carapace, which measures between 2.6 and 2.8 mm (0.10 and 0.11 in) in length and 2.15 and 2.45 mm (0.085 and 0.096 in) in width. It has a dark brown or black eye field that is covered in white and dark brown scales and long bristles. Its sternum, or underside of the cephalothorax, is yellow-brown. It has a yellow-brown clypeus and cheeks, the clypeus having a row of long brown bristles and scattering of white scales and the cheeks marked with a white band on each side. Its chelicerae are brown.

The female spider's abdomen is between 2.8 and 3 mm (0.12 in) long and between 2.65 mm (0.104 in) and 2.8 mm wide. It rounder than the carapace and yellow-brown, marked with an indistinct pattern. Its book lungs are yellow-brown and spinnerets are yellow with a covering of dense brown hairs. Its legs are yellow-brown, marked with brown spots and half rings. It has yellow pedipalps that are covered with long white hairs and dark brown bristles. Its epigyne, the external and most visible of its copulatory organs, is small with a low pocket and two copulatory openings that lie in bean-shaped depressions. The narrow insemination ducts loop and lead to complex spermathecae, or receptacles, and small accessory glands. The accessory glands show strong signs of sclerotization.

The male spider is similar to the related Aelurillus v-insignitus but can be distinguished by the lack of white stripes on its carapace. Its embolus is similar to Aelurillus m-nigrum except for the membrane found on the other species. It has a similar pattern to Aelurillus nenilini but can be identified by the stripe on its abdomen. The shape of its tibial apophysis is also different, this species being slightly bent. The female spiders are also similar to other species in the genus. They can be distinguished from the otherwise similar Aelurillus leipoldae and Aelurillus m-nigrum by the different pattern on their carapace and the more complicated structure of their spermathecae.

== Distribution and habitat ==
Aelurillus spiders have a wide distribution, mainly in the Palearctic realm, with 34 living in the area around the Mediterranean Sea. Aelurillus cypriotus is endemic to Cyprus. The holotype for this species was discovered in 1982. Other specimen have been found on the island. They are often seen living on stones in forests of Pinus brutia, Pinus nigra and Quercus alnifolia, while some have been found on dried river beds. They are known to live in places of human habitation, including one specimen found in a ski resort on Mount Olympus, and be content to live at altitudes of 1,120 m (3,670 ft) above sea level.
