= Aelurillus steinmetzi =

Scientific classification
- Kingdom: Animalia
- Phylum: Arthropoda
- Subphylum: Chelicerata
- Class: Arachnida
- Order: Araneae
- Infraorder: Araneomorphae
- Family: Salticidae
- Genus: Aelurillus
- Species: A. steinmetzi

Binomial name
- Aelurillus steinmetzi Metzner, 1999

Species of jumping spider

Aelurillus steinmetzi is a species of jumping spider in the genus Aelurillus that lives in Croatia and Greece. It generally prefers habitat between 95 and 150 m (312 and 492 ft) above sea level but can be found in a wide range of environments including dry river beds, sandy beaches and house walls. It is a small spider with a carapace that measures between 2.1 and 3.2 mm (0.083 and 0.126 in) in length and an abdomen that measures between 1.6 and 4.4 mm (0.063 and 0.173 in) in length. The female is larger than the male. The male has two distinctive v-shaped patterns on its eye field and light red hairs on its clypeus. The female's copulatory organs include complex spermathecae, or receptacles, with long accessory glands. The spider's legs are sandy yellow, the female having lighter legs than the male. It was first described in 1999.

== Taxonomy and etymology ==
Aelurillus steinmetzi is a species of jumping spider, a member of the family Salticidae, that was first described by the arachnologist Heiko Metzner in 1999. He allocated the species to the genus Aelurillus, which had been first circumscribed by Eugène Simon in 1885. The genus name is a Greek word that can be translated "cat" and the species name recalls Patrick Steinmetz, the person who, along with Christopher Glück, discovered the species.

The genus Aelurillus was placed in the subtribe Aelurillina in the tribe Aelurillini, both named after the genus, by Wayne Maddison in 2015. These were allocated to the clade Saltafresia. The In 2017, Jerzy Prószyński grouped the genus with nine other genera of jumping spiders under the name Aelurillines. It is closely related to the genus Manzuma and Rafalus, particularly in the shape of its body and the composition of its copulatory organs. The species belongs to the same group as Aelurillus v-insignitus and is closely related to Aelurillus alboclypeus, Aelurillus deltshevi and Aelurillus guecki.

== Description ==
Aelurillus steinmetzi is a small spider that has a rounded cephalothorax and a more spherical abdomen. The male's carapace, the hard upper shell of the cephalothorax, measures between 2.1 and 2.4 mm (0.083 and 0.094 in) in length and between 1.55 and 1.7 mm (0.061 and 0.067 in) in width. The top is dark brown with black margin and a surface marked with a scattering of dense yellowish-white hairs. It has a black eye field that is covered in light orange hairs and two v-shaped patterns made of hair. There are a small number of white hairs amongst the black hairs that are visible on the spider's sternum, or underside of the cephalothorax. It is dark brown and marked with a pattern of white dots. The spider has orange-brown chelicerae, which have a thin covering of back hairs and are marked with a dark brown markings that run from top to bottom, while its mouthparts, including its labium and maxillae, are dark brown with white tips.

The male's abdomen measures between 1.6 and 2.3 mm (0.063 and 0.091 in) in length and between 1.4 mm (0.055 in) and 1.6 mm in width. It is covered in ochre-black hairs with a topside that is marked with a single broad silver-white-grey stripe down the middle. The underside of the abdomen is light beige with a thinly covering of light grey hairs and black bristles. The spider has light beige inner spinnerets and dark brown outer spinnerets. Its legs are sandy yellow with dark markings and light grey and black hairs. Its pedipalps are lighter than its legs and covered in yellow and black hairs.

The male's clypeus is covered in light red hairs. These hairs most clearly distinguish the spider from others in the genus. It is particularly similar to the related Aelurillus v-insignitus but has a distinctive V-shaped pattern on its eye field that the other species lacks. It can also be distinguished from other Aelurillus species by its copulatory organs. Its cymbium is orange-brown and its tegulum is dark brown. The palpal tibia has a dense covering of white and golden-yellow hairs. There is a short and broad spike, known as its tibial apophysis that projects from the tibia. The palpal bulb has a pronounced pointed bulge on the side and at the bottom. Its embolus is accompanied by a spade-like projection.

The female has a brown carapace that is typically 3.2 mm (0.13 in) long and 2.4 mm (0.094 in) wide. The top is dark brown with a black eye field that is covered in short dense yellowish to light grey hairs. The underside is light orange and marked with black spots and prominent long white hairs. It has reddish-brown chelicerae that have white hairs at the bottom and its labium and maxillae are orange-brown with white tips. Its clypeus is long and covered in long translucent-white hairs.

The female spider's abdomen is typically 4.4 mm (0.17 in) long and 3.8 mm (0.15 in) wide. It is dark brown on top and covered in dense silver, white, grey, and brown hairs. The underside is similar to the male. Its legs are lighter than the male's. Its pedipalps are yellow-orange and have prominent white hairs and dark bristles. Its epigyne, the external and most visible of its copulatory organs, has a large pocket. The two copulatory openings lead, via short narrow insemination ducts, to complex spermathecae, or receptacles, with long accessory glands. The accessory glands show strong signs of sclerotization.

== Distribution and habitat ==
Aelurillus spiders have a wide distribution, mainly in the Palearctic realm, with 34 living in the area around the Mediterranean Sea. Aelurillus steinmetzi lives in Croatia and Greece. The holotype for this species was discovered in 1994 on the Greek island Paros. Other specimen have been found on the island. It has also been found on the nearby island Irakleia, the first example being found in 2017. The species is common on the island. It has also been found in Croatia, although there the spider has only been seen in Vaganac.

Aelurillus steinmetzi has been observed living in a range of environments. Some live on sandy beaches and rocks near the sea., while others have been collected from house walls. It has also been found living at the mouth of a cave. One specimen was found in an olive grove and another on a gravel river bed. It prefers lower altitudes, between 95 and 150 m (312 and 492 ft) above sea level. They are often seen between March and May.
