= Rafalus arabicus =

Scientific classification
- Kingdom: Animalia
- Phylum: Arthropoda
- Subphylum: Chelicerata
- Class: Arachnida
- Order: Araneae
- Infraorder: Araneomorphae
- Family: Salticidae
- Genus: Rafalus
- Species: R. arabicus

Binomial name
- Rafalus arabicus Wesołowska & van Harten, 2010

Species of spider

The Hajar Mountain Jumper or Rafalus arabicus is a species of jumping spider that lives in the Hajar Mountains of United Arab Emirates. A member of the genus Rafalus, it is one of the few species in the area that are active and visible at the hottest times of the day. It is a hairy medium-sized greyish-brown or reddish-brown spider that has a cephalothorax that is between 2.8 and 3.4 mm (0.11 and 0.13 in) long and an abdomen that is between 2.8 and 3.5 mm (0.14 in) long. There is a scutum covering half of the topside of the abdomen. The female is larger than the male but, otherwise, the male and female are similar, differing in their copulatory organs and slight differences in their forelegs. The male's legs are yellowish and have brown patches and have distinctive white and dark hairs. The female has light brown legs that have hairless yellow-orange femora. The spider is also distinguished by, in the female, the design of the epigyne which lacks the pocket found in other members of the genus.

== Taxonomy and etymology ==
Rafalus arabicus is a species of jumping spider, a member of the family Salticidae, that was first described by the arachnologists Wanda Wesołowska and Antonius van Harten in 2010. They allocated the species to the genus Rafalus, which had been first circumscribed by Jerzy Prószyński in 1999. He had named it after Jan Rafalsk, who was Professor of Zoology at the Adam Mickiewicz University in Poznań. The species is named after the Arabic Peninsula where it lives. It is known locally as the Hajar Mountain Jumper.

The genus Rafalus was placed in the subtribe Aelurillina in the tribe Aelurillini by Wayne Maddison in 2015, which was allocated to the clade Saltafresia. In 2017, Jerzy Prószyński grouped the genus with nine other genera of jumping spiders under the name Aelurillines. It is closely related to the genera Aelurillus and Manzuma, particularly in the shape of its body and the composition of its copulatory organs. The species was described at the first time as two other members of the genus.

== Description ==
The Hajar Mountain Jumper is a medium-sized hairy spider. It is generally reddish-brown or greyish-brown like the rocks where it lives. The male has a cephalothorax that ranges between 2.8 and 3 mm (0.11 and 0.12 in) in length and 2.1 and 2.2 mm (0.083 and 0.087 in) in width. Its carapace, the hard upper shell of the cephalothorax, is dark brown with a covering of short dense greyish hairs. There are white hairs on the sides of its carapace and a black line on its edges. Its eye field is black with brown bristles and small fawn scales visible near some of the eyes. The spider's sternum, or underside of the cephalothorax, is brown and covered in dark hairs. Its clypeus, visible from the front of the spider, is low and yellowish-brown. Its mouthparts, including its labium and maxillae, are brownish with pale tips, while its chelicerae are light brown with a one tooth to the rear and two to the front.

The male has an abdomen that is similar in length to its cephalothorax but narrower at typically 1.9 mm (0.075 in) wide. It has a greyish-brown topside covered in a combination of short whitish and long brown hairs, the bottom and sides being lighter and covered in dark hairs. There is a noticeable scutum covering half the upper side. Both the spinnerets and legs are brown apart from the femora of the front legs, which are yellowish and have brown patches. They have brown leg spines and there are some distinctive white and dark hairs on the forelegs. These hairs help to identify the spider. The pedipalps, sensory organs near the spider's mouth, are slim and very hairy. They have mainly black hairs, although some are white. The male's copulatory organs include a thin embolus that projects from the top of its elongated tegulum and a very small bump, known as its tibial apophysis, on the tibia.

The female is larger than the male. Its cephalothorax is between 3 and 3.4 mm (0.13 in) long and between 2.1 and 2.4 mm (0.094 in) wide and its abdomen is between 3.3 and 3.5 mm (0.13 and 0.14 in) long and 2.3 mm (0.091 in) and 2.4 mm wide. It is less hairy and has traces of a thin streak running down the top of its abdomen. Its legs are light brown and marked with darker patches or rings. Its forelegs are distinctive for their hairless yellow-orange femora. Its pedipalps are black and white. Its epigyne, the visible external part of its copulatory organs, is small and shows slight signs of sclerotisation. It has a ridge in the middle flanked by two fissure-like copulatory openings. The insemination ducts follow a path of loose loops that lead to small spherical spermathecae, or receptacles. The lack of a deep pocket in the epigyne and small size of the spermathecae distinguish the species from others in the genus.

== Distribution and habitat ==
Rafalus spiders live in the Near East and Central Asia. Rafalus arabicus lives in the United Arab Emirates, but it may have a wider species distribution as it lives amongst the Hajar Mountains that cross both Oman and the United Arab Emirates. Gary Feulner and Binish Roobas also consider that may live in the southern Zagros Mountains of Iran. The holotype was found near Wadi Maydaq in 2006. Other examples were found locally and on Jebel Hafeet.

Rafalus arabicus lives in the sparse vegetation found around the wadis that lie within the otherwise barren slopes of the Hajar Mountains. The species is active even at the hottest times of the day. It is one of the few non-flying arthropod species, alongside the beetle Adesmia cancellata, that is seen on rocks or soil in open sunlight. The species is the most commonly seen jumping spider in its habitat,
