= Aelurillus cretensis =

Scientific classification
- Kingdom: Animalia
- Phylum: Arthropoda
- Subphylum: Chelicerata
- Class: Arachnida
- Order: Araneae
- Infraorder: Araneomorphae
- Family: Salticidae
- Genus: Aelurillus
- Species: A. cretensis

Binomial name
- Aelurillus cretensis Azarkina, 2002

Species of jumping spider

Aelurillus cretensis is a species of jumping spider in the genus Aelurillus that lives on Crete, after which it is named. It lives in the Lefka Ori mountain range living at an altitudes of up to 2,000 m (6,600 ft) above sea level. It is a small spider, with a carapace measuring between 2.9 and 3.2 mm (0.11 and 0.13 in) in length and an abdomen. between 2.3 and 3.6 mm (0.091 and 0.142 in) in length. The female is larger than the.male. It is generally dark brown, although the female has a brownish-grey abdomen, darker than related species. Its legs are brown or dark brown. It has distinctive copulatory organs, the male having a larger base to its embolus found between the cymbium and the palpal bulb. The female can be identified by the shape of its epigynal pocket.

== Taxonomy and etymology ==
Aelurillus cretensis is a species of jumping spider, a member of the family Salticidae, that was first described by the arachnologist Galina Azarkina in 2002. She allocated the species to the genus Aelurillus, which had been first circumscribed by Eugène Simon in 1885. Like many of the genus, its taxonomic status is uncertain. The genus is named for the Greek word for cat and the species name recalls the place where the species was first found, Crete.

In 2002, Luděk Dobroruka described a new species named Aelurillus steliosi. In 2015, Azarkina and Marjan Komnenov identified species had been misnamed. The female was, in fact, an example of this species. Aelurillus steliosi was made a synonym of Aelurillus leipoldae. The genus Aelurillus was placed in the subtribe Aelurillina in the tribe Aelurillini, both named after the genus, by Wayne Maddison in the same year. These were allocated to the clade Saltafresia. In 2017, Jerzy Prószyński grouped the genus with nine other genera of jumping spiders under the name Aelurillines. It is closely related to the genus Manzuma and Rafalus, particularly in the shape of its body and the composition of its copulatory organs.

== Description ==
Aelurillus cretensis is a small spider with a body that consists of two parts, a rounded cephalothorax and an almost spherical abdomen. The male has a carapace, the hard upper shell of the cephalothorax, that is typically 2.9 mm (0.11 in) long and between 1.15 mm (0.045 in) wide. It is dark brown with a black eye field. Its sternum, or underside of the cephalothorax, is lighter brown. It has yellow-brown chelicerae, while its mouthparts, including its labium and maxillae, are simply brown. Its clypeus is dark brown and is covered in black hairs.

The male's abdomen is typically 2.3 mm (0.091 in) long and 2.1 mm (0.083 in) wide. It is dark brown like the carapace but differs in the presence of a band of white hairs that runs down the middle from the front to the back. |It has brown spinnerets and yellow-brown book lungss. The spider's legs and pedipalps are brown with a covering of white hairs on the legs. Its pedipalps have a knob on its femur and a covering of white hairs. Its cymbium is topped with short hairs, The palpal bulb has two bulges towards the bottom, lower than the palpal tibia, the lower one finishing with a pointed tip. The embolus starts between the bulb and the cymbium and curls around to project a short distance out of the bulb. The palpal tibia is also bulbous has a broad spike, known as its tibial apophysis.

The female has a dark brown carapace, which measures typically 3.2 mm (0.13 in) in length and 2.2 mm (0.087 in) in width. It has a black eye field that is covered in white scales while there are white hairs around the spider's eyes. Its sternum is brown. It has a dark brown clypeus that is covered in long white hairs. Its chelicerae, labium and maxillae and red-brown.

The female spider's abdomen is typically 3.6 mm (0.14 in) long and 3.1 mm (0.12 in) wide. It is brownish-grey with an indistinct pattern on the top. Its book lungs are brownish-grey and its spinnerets are greyish-brown. Its legs are dark brown. Its epigyne, the external and most visible of its copulatory organs, has a low pocket and two copulatory openings . The short insemination ducts lead to bean-shaped spermathecae, or receptacles, and small accessory glands. The accessory glands show strong signs of sclerotization.

The spider is similar to the related Aelurillus leipoldae and Aelurillus m-nigrum but is darker than either of the other species. It can also be distinguished by its copulatory organs. The base of the embolus is larger in this species and shape of the pocket in the epigyne is different.

== Distribution and habitat ==
Aelurillus spiders have a wide distribution, mainly in the Palearctic realm, with 34 living in the area around the Mediterranean Sea. Aelurillus cretensis is endemic to Crete. The holotype for this species was discovered amongst the Lefka Ori mountain range living at an altitudes of 1,650 m (5,410 ft) above sea level in 1991. Other examples have been found nearby at altitudes of up to 2,000 m (6,600 ft) above sea level. It generally lives in mountainous environments but one male specimen was found living amongst and under stones in the moist bed of a stream.
