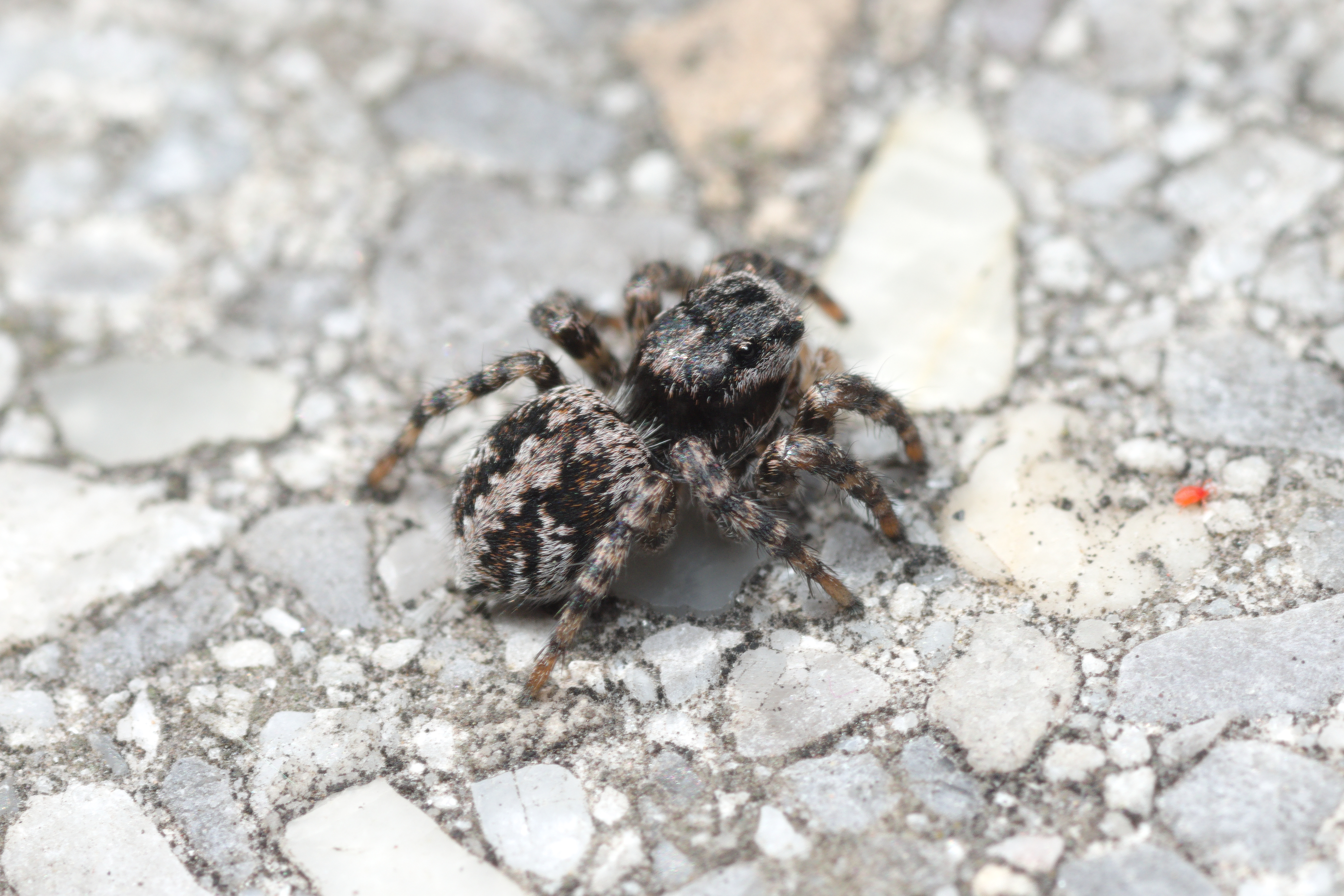
- The related Aelurillus v-insignitus

Scientific classification
- Kingdom: Animalia
- Phylum: Arthropoda
- Subphylum: Chelicerata
- Class: Arachnida
- Order: Araneae
- Infraorder: Araneomorphae
- Family: Salticidae
- Genus: Aelurillus
- Species: A. hirtipes

Binomial name
- Aelurillus hirtipes Denis, 1960

Synonyms
- Aelurillus sinaicus Prószyński, 2000

= Aelurillus hirtipes =

Species of spider

Aelurillus hirtipes, synonym Aelurillus sinaicus, is a species of jumping spider in the genus Aelurillus that lives in North Africa. First identified by Jacques Denis in Chad in 1960 as part of the Missions Berliet-Ténéré, it has also been found in Algeria, Egypt and Morocco. The spider is small, with a brown carapace that is between 3.5 and 3.6 mm (0.14 and 0.14 in) long and a yellow abdomen that measures between 3 and 4 mm (0.12 and 0.16 in) in length. The male has a small hooked embolus protruding from its palpal bulb and the female has S-shaped flaps on the epigyne and short copulatory ducts. The spider has a covering of light hairs, whiter on the female and more yellow on the male. These hairs help distinguish it from the related Aelurillus v-insignitus and Aelurillus plumipes

== Taxonomy ==
Aelurillus hirtipes was first described by Jacques Denis in 1960. It was placed in the genus Aelurillus that was first described by Eugène Simon in 1885. The genus name derives from the Greek word for cat. It was placed in the subtribe Aelurillina in the tribe Aelurillini, both named after the genus, by Wayne Maddison in 2015. These were allocated to the clade Saltafresia. In 2017, the genus was grouped with nine other genera of jumping spiders under the name Aelurillines.

Initially, only the male was described. In 2000, Jerzy Prószyński described another new species, Aelurillus sinaicus. These were later found to be of existing species. One example, found in Egypt, was allocated to this species in 2006 by Galina Azarkina and Vladamir Logunov. This was also a male, but the female of the species was described at the same time.

== Description ==
The spider is small, with a length of typically 6 mm (0.24 in). The female has a brown carapace that is 3.5 mm (0.14 in) in length and 2.7 mm (0.11 in) in width. It is covered by white scales. The yellow abdomen is 4 mm (0.16 in) long and 2.9 mm (0.11 in) wide. The clypeus is also yellow, as are the spinnerets, although they lack the white hairs that are common on the clypeus. White hairs also cover the yellow pedipalps and legs. The chelicerae are brown. The epigyne is oval with a small pocket and two widely spaced copulatory openings which are enclosed by flaps that form an S-shape. The ducts are short and lead to bean-like spermathecae.

The male is slightly smaller than the female. The carapace is 3.6 mm (0.14 in) long and 2.5 mm (0.098 in) wide with similar colouring. The abdomen is 3 mm (0.12 in) long and 2.3 mm (0.091 in) wide and, although generally similar in colour, has a pattern of white-yellow and brown scales. The chelicerae, clypeus, legs and spinneret are all similar in colour to the female, but the hairs are more yellow than white. The palpal bulb is large with a small hook-like embolus.

The species is closely related to Aelurillus plumipes. However, the shape and shorter length of the copulatory ducts on the female and the light coloured hairs on the male carapace and legs distinguish the species. It is also similar to Aelurillus v-insignitus, differing in the lack of hair on the legs.

== Distribution ==
The spider has a range across North Africa. It was first identified in Chad by an expedition that was part of the Missions Berliet-Ténéré, with the holotype found in the Sahara Desert and another example in the Tibesti Mountains. It has been seen near Bordj Bou Arréridj and Tamanrasset in Algeria and in Ksar es Souk in Morocco. The example originally named Aelurillus sinaicus was found on the Sinai Peninsula in Egypt.
