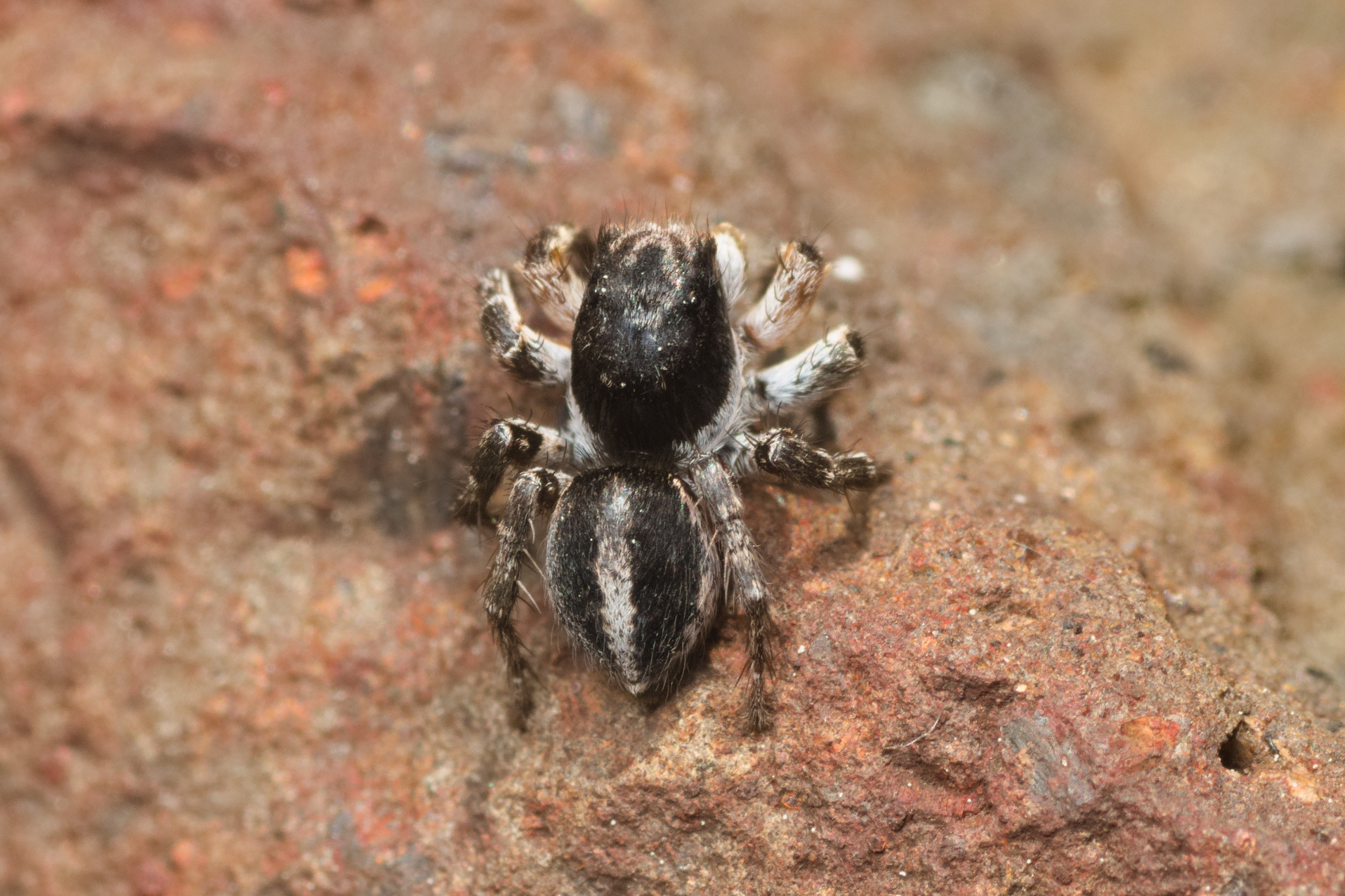
- The related Aelurillus v-insignitus, which has been confused with this species

Scientific classification
- Kingdom: Animalia
- Phylum: Arthropoda
- Subphylum: Chelicerata
- Class: Arachnida
- Order: Araneae
- Infraorder: Araneomorphae
- Family: Salticidae
- Genus: Aelurillus
- Species: A. brutus

Binomial name
- Aelurillus brutus Wesołowska, 1996

= Aelurillus brutus =

Species of spider

Aelurillus brutus is a species of jumping spider in the genus Aelurillus that lives in Kazakhstan and Turkmenistan. The spider is small with a carapace that is between 2.5 and 3.2 mm (0.098 and 0.126 in) long and an abdomen between 2.4 and 4.7 mm (0.094 and 0.185 in) in length. The female is larger than the male. The spider is generally dark brown and hairy, but the male abdomen has a pattern of grey-yellow wavy lines. The difference between this species and others in the genus are subtle. The females are particularly difficult to distinguish. However, there are three distinctive stripes on the eye field and a pattern on the bottom of the abdomen that help to distinguish the spider from others in the genus. The female was first described by Wanda Wesołowska in 1996 and the male by Galina Azarkina in 2003.

== Taxonomy ==
Aelurillus brutus is a species of jumping spider, a member of the family Salticidae, that was first described by the arachnologist Wanda Wesołowska in 1996. It was one of over 500 species identified by the Polish scientist during her career. She placed it in the genus Aelurillus that was first circumscribed by Eugène Simon in 1885. It was placed in the subtribe Aelurillina in the tribe Aelurillini, both named after the genus, by Wayne Maddison in 2015. These were allocated to the clade Saltafresia. In 2017, the genus was grouped with nine other genera of jumping spiders under the name Aelurillines.

Initially, only the female was described. In 2003, Galina Azarkina first described the male, and also demonstrated the relationship between the species and other Aelurillus spiders. She also found that a specimen of Aelurillus v-insignitus from 1985 had been misidentified and was in fact an example of this species. The specific name is a Latin word that can be translated cumbersome or heavy. The genus name derives from the Greek word for cat.

== Description ==
Aelurillus brutus is a medium-sized spider with distinctive features. It has a body that is divided into two parts, a cephalothorax and an abdomen. The female has a dark brown, nearly black, carapace, the hard upper part of the cephalothorax, which is typically 3.2 mm (0.13 in) in length and 2 mm (0.079 in) in width. It has a covering of short white hairs and long brown bristles around the eyes, that sit within a short eye field. The carapace is high and looks stretched in length, with more width towards the back. The underside of the cephalothorax, or sternum, is black and clothed in white hairs. The clypeus, or face of the spider, is dark brown. The chelicerae, part of the mouthparts, are brown, while the remaining mouthparts, its labium and maxillae, have large pale edges but are also otherwise brown.

The spider's abdomen is bulgy and also looks stretched, measuring between 4.7 and 4.8 mm (0.19 and 0.19 in) in length and 3.2 and 3.3 mm (0.13 and 0.13 in) in width. The back is pointy and the whole abdomen has a scattering of grey-yellow hairs interspersed with a small number of brown bristles on the back. It is yellowish-grey on the top but lighter underneath. Its spinnerets are also yellowish-grey or brown and its book lung covers are grey. Its legs have long light brown hairs and are either brown-yellow or orange-yellow with patches of brown visible on many specimen. It has brown or yellow pedipalps, sensory organs near its face. Its epigyne, the external visible part of the spider's copulatory organs, is oval with a large pocket near the furrow at its rear and two central copulatory openings. The openings lead, via relatively short insemination ducts, to complex and elongated spermathecae, or receptacles. There are also very noticeable accessory glands. The spider has three distinctive stripes on its eye field and, unlike many in the genus, lacks hairs on its legs and the sides of the carapace.

The male is slightly smaller than the female. Its dark brown carapace is typically 2.5 mm (0.098 in) long and 1.8 mm (0.071 in) wide and covered in white scales. Its clypeus is also dark brown like the female but is covered in white hairs and bristles. Its chelicerae are brown-yellow. Its abdomen is 2.4 mm (0.094 in) long and 1.8 mm wide, grey-yellow with a pattern of indistinct wavy lines. Its spinnerets are brown-yellow and its book lung covers are grey-yellow. Its legs are brown-yellow with dark brown patches but the pedipalps are brown rather than yellow and covered in white hairs.

The male's copulatory organs are distinctive. The cymbium is hairy, particularly densely towards the top, and similar in size to the remainder of the palpal bulb. The tegulum is large and complicated in shape, almost rhomboid with a hook at the bottom and a small embolus projecting from the top. The palpal tibia has a blunt projection, called a tibial apophysis, that has a wide root and narrows dramatically to form a rounded end.

The species is closely related to Aelurillus helvanacius but the female has distinctive flaps on its epigyne. The morphological differences between the species, Aelurillus ater and Aelurillus dubatolovi are subtle. Unlike Aelurillus ater, the spider has white hairs on the clypeus and, unlike both the other species, short hairs on the side of the carapace and a pattern on the bottom of the abdomen. Not unusually for this genus, the females of all three species are hard to tell apart.

== Distribution ==
Aelurillus brutus is endemic to central Asia. The spider was first found in Gaplaňgyr Nature Reserve on the south Ustyurt Plateau in Turkmenistan. The holotype, a female, was collected in 1985. The spider has also been seen in the Repetek Biosphere State Reserve. In 2003, Azarkina extended the species distribution to include Kazakhstan based on paratypes found on the then-island Barsa-Kelmes, in the Ustyurt Nature Reserve and on the Mangyshlak Peninsula. It is reckoned to live across both western Kazakhstan and Turkmenistan.
