= Aelurillus kopetdaghi =

Scientific classification
- Kingdom: Animalia
- Phylum: Arthropoda
- Subphylum: Chelicerata
- Class: Arachnida
- Order: Araneae
- Infraorder: Araneomorphae
- Family: Salticidae
- Genus: Aelurillus
- Species: A. kopetdaghi

Binomial name
- Aelurillus kopetdaghi Wesołowska, 1996

Species of jumping spider

Aelurillus kopetdaghi is a species of jumping spider that lives in the mountains of Turkmenistan. A member of the genus Aelurillus, it was first described in 1996 by Wanda Wesołowska. A dark brown and medium-sized spider, it has a bristly carapace that is between 3.4 and 3.5 mm (0.13 and 0.14 in) long and a hairy abdomen that is between 3.2 and 4.1 mm (0.13 and 0.16 in) long. Its hairy legs are orange or orange-brown. The female is larger than the male. They also differ in details, such as the colour of the pedipalps, which are orange and brown, respectively. The copulatory organs of the female are superficially similar to those of other species in the genus, like Aelurillus v-insignitus, but the internal structure is more complex. This makes them hard to distinguish from other spiders in the genus.

== Taxonomy and etymology ==
Aelurillus kopetdaghi is a species of jumping spider, a member of the family Salticidae, that was first described by the arachnologist Wanda Wesołowska in 1996. It is one of over 500 species identified by the Polish scientist during her career. She placed it in the genus Aelurillus, first described by Eugène Simon in 1885. The name of the genus derives from the Greek word for 'cat' and the specific name is derived from the location where it was first found, Kopet Dag. The type material for the species is stored at the Zoological Institute of the Russian Academy of Sciences in St Petersburg.

The genus Aelurillus was placed in the subtribe Aelurillina in the tribe Aelurillini, both named after the genus, by Wayne Maddison in 2015. These were allocated to the clade Saltafresia. In 2017, Jerzy Prószyński grouped the genus with nine other genera of jumping spiders under the name Aelurillines.

== Description ==
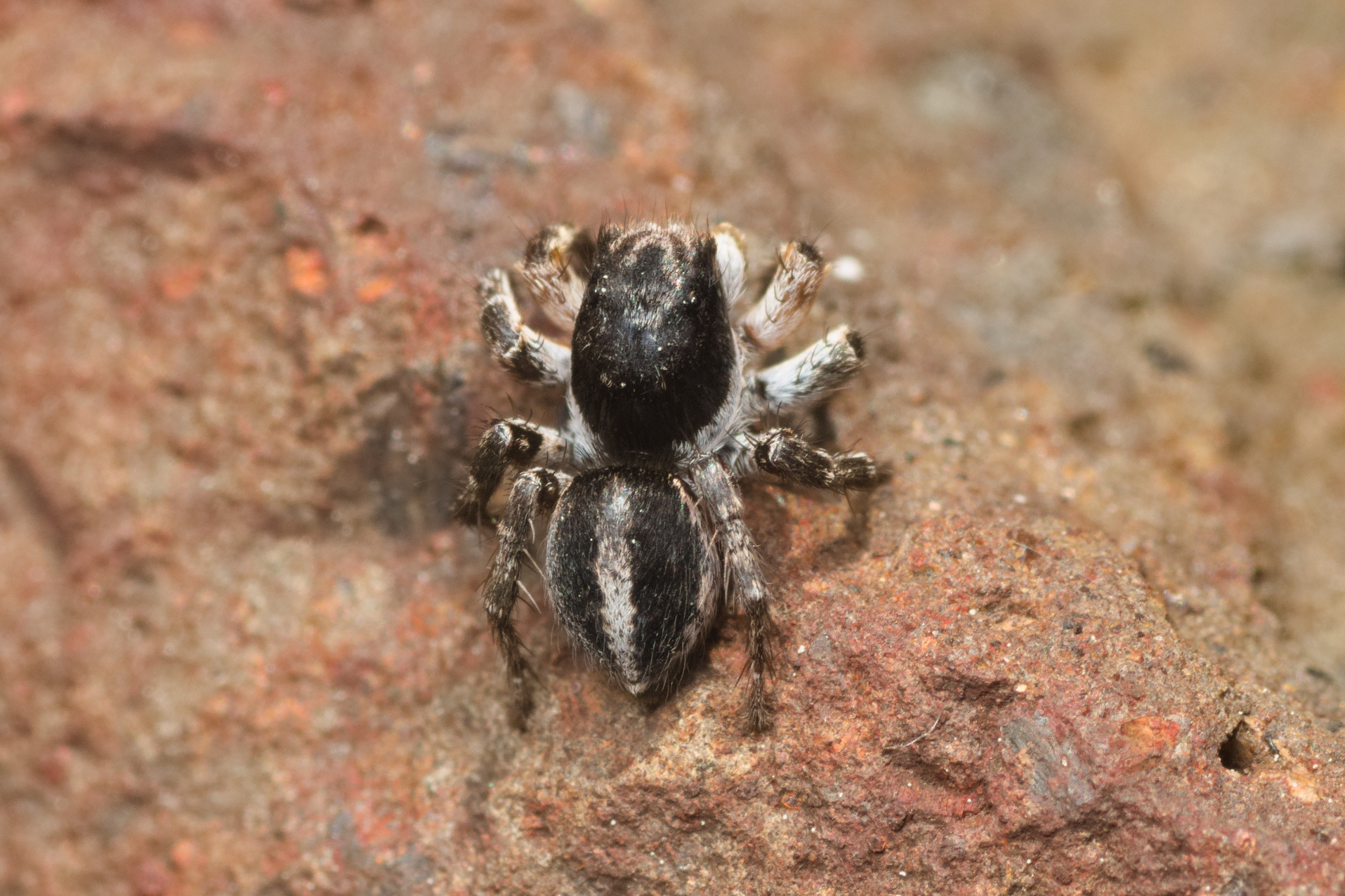
The related Aelurillus v-insignitus

Spiders of the Aelurillus genus are medium to large hairy spiders. Their body is divided into two main parts: a forward section known as a cephalothorax and, behind that, another section called an abdomen. The male Aelurillus kopetdaghi has a carapace, the hard upper side of its cephalothorax, that is typically 3.4 mm (0.13 in) long and 2.1 mm (0.083 in) wide. It is dark brown, nearly black, and has many long brown bristles. The bristles are especially common on the spider's eye field. The male's sternum, the under side of its cephalothorax, is black. The spider has two small teeth visible at the front of its chelicerae and another at the back. Like the rest of its mouthparts, including its labium and maxilae, its chelicerae are brown.

The male's abdomen is dark brown like its carapace. It is elongated, typically 3.2 mm (0.13 in) long and 2.4 mm (0.094 in) wide and covered with dense long brown hairs. The base of the abdomen is darker than the top. The spider's spinnerets, used for spinning webs, vary in colour, with the forward ones darker than those towards the back. Its legs are orange and hairy, and its pedipalps, sensory organs near its mouth, are brown and hairy.

The male's copulatory organs include a hairy cymbium that is attached to a rounded palpal bulb. The palpal bulb consists of a bulbous tegulum that has a large pointy bulge that projects downwards to lie beside the palpal tibia. There is a smaller bulge at the top that finishes in a small straight embolus. The spider's palpal tibia has clumps of long hairs and three hooked spikes, or tibial apophyses. The shape of the copulatory organs differentiates the species from others in the genus.

The female is similar to the male in shape but slightly larger. Its carapace is typically 3.5 mm (0.14 in) long and 2.3 mm (0.091 in) wide and its abdomen is typically 4.1 in (100 mm) long and 3.1 mm (0.12 in) wide. Its carapace is higher than that of the male and has a darker eye field. Although its sternum is yellowish-orange, the spider has similar mouthparts to the male. The abdomen is more rounded, with a pointed end, with golden hairs visible amongst the darker ones as found in the male. It is dark brown on top and lighter underneath. Its legs are orange-brown with patches of darker hues and longer hairs. Its pedipalps are orange. It has many similarities to the related Aelurillus affinis and Aelurillus v-insignitus, particularly in the shape of the epigyne, the external visible part of its copulatory organs. This is rounded with two diagonal copulatory openings. The internal structure of the female's copulatory organs is more complex than that of either the other two species, with very clear accessory glands.

== Distribution ==
Aelurillus spiders have a wide distribution, mainly in the Palearctic realm. The spider is endemic to central Asia. It has only been seen in Turkmenistan. The holotype was found around the mountains of the Kopet Dag in 1985, along with other examples. It typically lives at an altitude of between 800 and 1,000 m (2,600 and 3,300 ft) above sea level. It has only been found in the south west of the mountain range.
