= Rafalus minimus =

Scientific classification
- Kingdom: Animalia
- Phylum: Arthropoda
- Subphylum: Chelicerata
- Class: Arachnida
- Order: Araneae
- Infraorder: Araneomorphae
- Family: Salticidae
- Genus: Rafalus
- Species: R. minimus

Binomial name
- Rafalus minimus Wesołowska & van Harten, 2010

Species of jumping spider

Rafalus minimus is a species of jumping spider that lives in the United Arab Emirates. It is smaller than other members of the genus Rafalus, which is recalled in its specific name. Only the male has been described. It has a cephalothorax that is between 2.1 and 2.3 mm (0.083 and 0.091 in) long and an abdomen that is between 1.9 mm (0.075 in) and 2.1 mm long. Its brown carapace has two white stripes and its sternum is plain dark brown. Its abdomen is dark brown with a single white stripe on top and yellow underneath. Apart from its size, it is distinguished from other members of its genus by its copulatory organs, particularly the shape of its tibial apophysis, which has a wide base and a blunt end.

== Taxonomy and etymology ==
Rafalus minimus is a species of jumping spider, a member of the family Salticidae, that was first described by the arachnologists Wanda Wesołowska and Antonius van Harten in 2010. They allocated the species to the genus Rafalus, which had been first circumscribed by Jerzy Prószyński in 1999. He had named it after Jan Rafalsk, who was Professor of Zoology at the Adam Mickiewicz University in Poznań. The species is named for its small size.

The genus Rafalus was placed in the subtribe Aelurillina in the tribe Aelurillini by Wayne Maddison in 2015, which was allocated to the clade Saltafresia. In 2017, Jerzy Prószyński grouped the genus with nine other genera of jumping spiders under the name Aelurillines. It is closely related to the genera Aelurillus and Manzuma, particularly in the shape of its body and the composition of its copulatory organs. The species was described at the first time as two other members of the genus.

== Description ==
Rafalus minimus is a small spider, smaller and less hairy than other members of the genus. The male has a cephalothorax that ranges between 2.1 and 2.3 mm (0.083 and 0.091 in) in length and 1.5 and 1.6 mm (0.059 and 0.063 in) in width. Its oval carapace, the hard upper shell of the cephalothorax, is dark brown and marked with a pattern of two bands that run from the front to the back made up of white hairs. It is slightly narrower at the front and has a short eye field with long brown bristles near its eyes. The spider's sternum, or underside of the cephalothorax, is dark brown. Its clypeus, visible from the front of the spider, is brown and has some grey hairs. Its mouthparts, including its labium and maxillae, are dark brownish with yellowish inner margins on its maxillae.

The spider has an abdomen that is smaller than its cephalothorax, measuring between 1.9 mm (0.075 in) and 2.1 mm long and 1.4 mm (0.055 in) and 1.5 mm wide. It is an ovoid that has a brown topside covered in short hairs interspersed with longer brown bristles. There is a white stripe that runs down the middle. The bottom of the abdomen is yellow with a hint of grey and its sides are yellow. The spider's spinnerets are generally lighter than the rest of the spider except for the bases of the rearmost ones, which are blackish. Its forward legs are brownish and its back legs are yellow. They have brown sections and brown rings between some of the sections.

The male's copulatory organs are distinctive. Its pedipalps, sensory organs near the spider's mouth, are yellow with small brown sections. A thin embolus that projects from near the top of its tegulum and curves around hidden by the spider's cymbium so very little of it is visible. There is a very small appendage, known as a tibial apophysis, on the palpal tibia that has a wide base and a blunt end. As well as the spider's small size, it is the shape of the tibial apophysis that helps identify the spider. The female has not been identified.

== Distribution ==
Rafalus spiders live in the Near East and Central Asia. Rafalus minimus is endemic to the United Arab Emirates. The male holotype was found north of Ajman in 2009.
