= Aelurillus galinae =

Scientific classification
- Kingdom: Animalia
- Phylum: Arthropoda
- Subphylum: Chelicerata
- Class: Arachnida
- Order: Araneae
- Infraorder: Araneomorphae
- Family: Salticidae
- Genus: Aelurillus
- Species: A. galinae

Binomial name
- Aelurillus galinae Wesołowska & van Harten, 2010

Species of jumping spider

Aelurillus galinae is a species of jumping spider that is endemic to the United Arab Emirates. First described in 2010 by Wanda Wesołowska and Antonius van Harten and allocated to the genus Aelurillus, the spider is named after the arachnologist Galina Azarkina. The species is small with a forward section, or cephalothorax, that is between 1.5 and 1.8 mm (0.059 and 0.071 in) long and, behind that, an abdomen that is between 1.4 and 2.2 mm (0.055 and 0.087 in) long. The female is larger than the male. The female has a spherical abdomen that has a grey and fawn pattern. The male abdomen has a wide brown stripe across the middle and is otherwise yellow. The carapace, the upper section of the cephalothorax, of both similar. The species is distinguished from others in the genus by the way that the front set of eyes extend beyond the front of the carapace, its distinctive leg airs, and the way that the appendage on the male's palpal bulb, part of the spider's copulatory organs have blended.

== Taxonomy and etymology ==
Aelurillus galinae is a jumping spider, a member of the family Salticidae, that was first described by the arachnologists Wanda Wesołowska and Antonius van Harten in 2010. It is one of over 500 species identified by Wesolowska during her career. They allocated the species to the genus Aelurillus, which had been first circumscribed by Eugène Simon in 1885. The species' generic name derives from the Greek word for 'cat'. Its specific name is in honour of the arachnologist Galina Azarkina.

The spider was placed in the subtribe Aelurillina in the tribe Aelurillini, both named after the genus, by Canadian biologist Wayne Maddison in 2015. These were allocated to the clade Saltafresia. In 2017, Polish arachnologist Jerzy Prószyński grouped the genus with nine other genera of jumping spiders under the name Aelurillines. It is closely related to the genus Manzuma and Rafalus, particularly in the shape of its body and the composition of its copulatory organs. Thw holotype is stored at the Royal Museum for Central Africa in Tervuren, Belgium.

== Description ==
Aelurillus galinae is a small spider. The male has a cephalothorax that is between 1.5 and 1.6 mm (0.059 and 0.063 in) in length and 1.2 and 1.4 mm (0.047 and 0.055 in) in width. It has a brown carapace, the hard upper surface of its cephalothorax, with a short black eye field. There is a pattern of four thin lines formed of white hairs on the eye field that merge into two wider stripes on the thorax. The carapace has a distinctive shape, particularly at the front, with the front set of eyes extending beyond the body, particularly the central eyes. Its sternum, or underside of the cephalothorax, is light brown, The part of its face known as its clypeus is brown with light hair. Its chelicerae light brown with dark hairs and its maxillae are darker and have yellow tips, while the remaining mouthparts, including, its labium, are simply light brown.

Situated behind its cephalothorax, the male's yellow abdomen is between 1.4 and 1.6 mm (0.055 and 0.063 in) long and 1 and 1.1 mm (0.039 and 0.043 in) wide. It has a wide brown stripe across the middle of its upper surface although its underside is plain and lighter. The spider's spinnerets are greyish. Its legs are yellow and hairy; they have long spines. Its pedipalps are also light in colour, which is accentuated by them being covered in white hairs. The spider's copulatory organs are distinctive. The male's pedipalp terminates with a tibia that has two spikes, known as its tibial apophyses. One, which is blunter than the other, shows slight signs of sclerotization. At the end of the tibia is a smooth cymbium. The spider's palpal bulb is an almost triangular shape with a distinctive blended appendage that extends from the middle. At the summit of the bulb is a small slightly curved embolus that fits in a small valley in the spider's cymbium.

The female is slightly larger than the male, with a cephalothorax that is 1.7 and 1.8 mm (0.067 and 0.071 in) long and 1.3 and 1.4 mm (0.051 and 0.055 in) wide and an abdomen 1.9 and 2.2 mm (0.075 and 0.087 in) long and 1.9 and 2.2 mm (0.075 and 0.087 in) wide. The colouring of the carapace is similar, although the lines are less clear, but the distinctive position of the eyes is the same. Its legs are spotted brown, but otherwise also similar.

In contrast, the female's abdomen is very different to the male, being spherical and swollen in shape and patterned with fawn and greyish patches. Its epigyne, the external visible part of the female's copulatory organs, is typical for the genus. It has a pocket and wings lining the copulatory openings. Internally, the two openings lead to relatively short insemination ducts and rounded spermathecae, or receptacles. The spider also has rounded accessory glands.

The spider can be distinguished from others in the genus by the shape of its head, in particular the front edge and the way that its foremost eyes are set back. The tibia on its forelegs have distinctive long black hairs. A closer inspection of its copulatory organs, and particularly the male's blended apophysis, can also confirm its identity. The female is harder to identify, but the presence of long bowl-like features at the entrance to its seminal ducts and the simple structure of its spermathecae.

== Distribution ==
Aelurillus spiders have a wide distribution, mainly in the Palearctic realm. Aelurillus galinae is endemic to the United Arab Emirates. First found in Sharjah Desert Park in Sharjah, it has also been identified in Al Wathba Wetland Reserve in Abu Dhabi.
