= Aelurillus mirabilis =

Scientific classification
- Kingdom: Animalia
- Phylum: Arthropoda
- Subphylum: Chelicerata
- Class: Arachnida
- Order: Araneae
- Infraorder: Araneomorphae
- Family: Salticidae
- Genus: Aelurillus
- Species: A. mirabilis

Binomial name
- Aelurillus mirabilis Wesołowska, 2006

Species of jumping spider

Aelurillus mirabilis is a species of jumping spider in the genus Aelurillus that lives in Namibia, particularly around Brandberg Mountain. The spider is medium-sized to large, with a dark brown carapace that is between 2.6 and 3.6 mm (0.10 and 0.14 in) long and a fawn or grey abdomen that is between 2.2 and 3.3 mm (0.087 and 0.130 in) long. The spider has an indistinct marking of two brown streaks on the abdomen, which is nearly invisible on the female. It has a very small tooth visible in the dark yellow chelicerae and short hard spines on the eye field. It is unusual in the genus for the lack of central depression and sclerotized flaps at the top of the copulatory openings in the female epigyne. This, along with the shape of the male copulatory organs with their distinctive coiled embolus, enable the spider to be differentiated from others in the genus. It was first described in 2006 by Wanda Wesołowska.

== Taxonomy and etymology ==
Aelurillus mirabilis is a species of jumping spider, a member of the family Salticidae, that was first described by the arachnologist Wanda Wesołowska in 2006. It is one of over 500 species identified by the Polish scientist during her career. It was tentatively placed in the genus Aelurillus, although Wesołowska was initially wary of the allocation due to the difference of some of the features of both the male and female from the rest of the genus, first circumscribed by Eugène Simon in 1885. The genus name derives from the Greek word for cat and the species name is derived from the Latin word for strange.

The genus Aelurillus was placed in the subtribe Aelurillina in the tribe Aelurillini, both named after the genus, by Wayne Maddison in 2015. These were allocated to the clade Saltafresia. In 2017, Jerzy Prószyński grouped the genus with nine other genera of jumping spiders under the name Aelurillines. It is closely related to the genus Manzuma and Rafalus, particularly in the shape of its body and the composition of its copulatory organs.

== Description ==
The spider is medium-sized to large and hairy. The male has a dark brown carapace that measures between 2.6 and 3 mm (0.10 and 0.12 in) in length and between 1.9 and 2.1 mm (0.075 and 0.083 in) in width. Pear-shaped, broadest about two-thirds along its length, and moderately high, it is covered with whitish grey hairs and scattered long brown bristles. There is a noticeable fovea present. The underside of the carapace, of spider's sternum, is dark brown with whitish hairs. The spider's eye field is short and almost black and, as well as some white scales near some of the eyes, has short hard spines towards the front which decrease in size towards the back. The clypeus is brown. The mouthparts include dark yellow chelicerae with a one very small tooth visible, brown labium and yellow maxillae, the last with dark brown hairs on their tips.

The male abdomen is round and fawn in colour with two faint brown streaks. It is between 2.2 and 2.5 mm (0.087 and 0.098 in) long and 1.7 and 2.0 mm (0.067 and 0.079 in) wide. It is covered in hairs that match the pattern on the top, although the markings themselves are indistinct. There are long bristles on the front edge. While the sides are yellowish-fawn, the base of the abdomen is whitish-yellow. The spinnerets are brown, thin and long, and its legs are short and robust. They range from dark yellow to light brown, with darker patches on some segments, and are covered in long dense brown and whitish hairs. There are many leg spines. The pedipalps, sensory organs near the mouth, are yellow with a covering of greyish white hairs. The shape of the copulatory organs differentiate the species from others in the genus. The male has a brown palpal bulb that has two distinctive protuberances and a single projection that extends from the central area of the bulb. The palpal tibia has a single spike, or tibial apophysis that shows evidence of sclerotization. The spider's embolus is coiled and hidden so only the tip is visible.

The female is similar to the male in shape but slightly larger. It has an carapace 3.2 to 3.6 mm (0.13 to 0.14 in) long and 2.4 to 2.8 mm (0.094 to 0.110 in) wide and an abdomen that is between 2.6 and 3.3 in (66 and 84 mm) long and 2.4 to 2.9 mm (0.094 to 0.114 in) wide. It looks generally similar to the male, although the spider's abdomen is plain, an almost uniform grey, and covered in greyish hairs, and the brown markings are even more indistinct. A scattering of long brown bristles can also be seen on the top of the abdomen. It has a noticeably high brown clypeus that has white hairs and no teeth in its chelicerae. The spider's pedipalps are yellow with white hairs. The epigyne has a large pocket near a fold in the middle and two fissure-like copulatory openings. The insemination ducts are very broad and the spermathecae, or receptacles, are spherical. It is unusual in the genus for the lack of central depression and sclerotized flaps at the top of the copulatory openings.

== Distribution ==
Aelurillus spiders are found across much of Africa, Europe and Asia, with many species living in Africa. Aelurillus mirabilis is endemic to Namibia. The species was first identified in the area around the Brandberg Mountain, based on a male holotype and multiple female and male paratypes collected in 2000.
