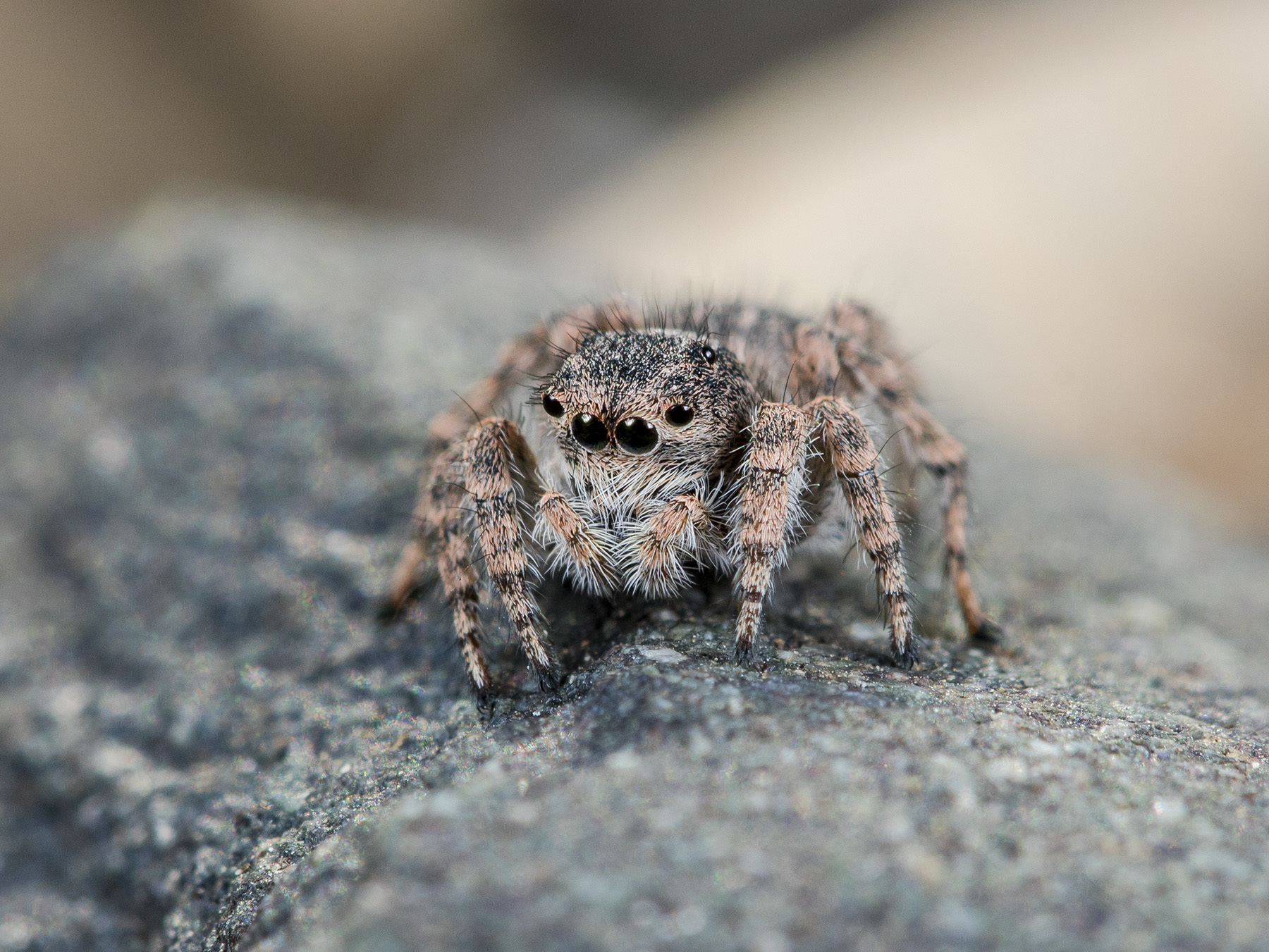
- The related Aelurillus dubatolovi

Scientific classification
- Kingdom: Animalia
- Phylum: Arthropoda
- Subphylum: Chelicerata
- Class: Arachnida
- Order: Araneae
- Infraorder: Araneomorphae
- Family: Salticidae
- Genus: Aelurillus
- Species: A. timidulus

Binomial name
- Aelurillus timidulus Wesołowska & Tomasiewicz, 2008

= Aelurillus tumidulus =

Species of spider

Aelurillus timidulus is a species of jumping spider in the genus Aelurillus that is endemic to Ethiopia. It was first described in 2008 by Wanda Wesołowska and Beata Tomasiewicz. Only the female has been described. It is a small spider with a cephalothorax 2 mm (0.079 in) long and rounded abdomen 2.8 mm (0.11 in) long. The body is black at the front, dark brown at the back of the high pear-shaped carapace and greyish beige across the abdomen. It has a smaller epigyne than others in the genus, but the copulatory organs are otherwise similar to other Aelurillus spiders, having a central pocket and wings alongside the copulatory openings.

== Taxonomy ==
Aelurillus timidulus is a jumping spider, a member of the family Salticidae, that was first described by Wanda Wesołowska and Beata Tomasiewicz in 2008. It is one of over 500 species identified by the Polish arachnologist Wesołowska. It was placed in the genus Aelurillus, first described by Eugène Simon in 1885. The genus name derives from the Greek word for cat and the species name is derived from the Latin for bulging. The genus was placed in the subtribe Aelurillina in the tribe Aelurillini, both named after the genus, by Wayne Maddison in 2015. These were allocated to the clade Saltafresia. In 2017, the genus was grouped with nine other genera of jumping spiders under the name Aelurillines.

== Description ==
Only the female has been described. It is a small spider; the cephalothorax 2 mm (0.079 in) long and 1.6 mm (0.063 in) wide and abdomen is 2.8 mm (0.11 in) long and 2.7 mm (0.11 in) wide. The carapace is shaped like a pear, high with a very steep slope from the middle to the back. It is black to the front, towards the eye field, and dark brown towards the back, covered with dense grey-white hairs. The abdomen is round and looks swollen. It is generally lighter, a greyish beige, and has short colourless hairs and bristles. The clypeus is low and dark. The chelicerae has one rear and two front teeth. The spinnerets are grey. The legs are yellow, brown and hairy. The epigyne is very small with a notch along the back. The epigyne is smaller than others in the genus, which is a key distinguishing feature Otherwise, it is similar to other Aelurillus spiders in its features, including its a central pocket. There are small wings along the side of the copulatory openings that have slight sclerotization.

== Distribution ==
The spider is endemic to Ethiopia. The species was first identified in the Awash National Park, based on a female holotype collected in 1988.
