= Adesmia =

Adesmia may refer to:

- Adesmia (plant), a genus of flowering plants in the legume family
- Adesmia (beetle), a genus of darkling beetles
