= Aelurillus kronestedti =

Scientific classification
- Kingdom: Animalia
- Phylum: Arthropoda
- Subphylum: Chelicerata
- Class: Arachnida
- Order: Araneae
- Infraorder: Araneomorphae
- Family: Salticidae
- Genus: Aelurillus
- Species: A. kronestedti

Binomial name
- Aelurillus kronestedti Azarkina, 2004

Species of spider

Aelurillus kronestedti is a species of spider of the genus Aelurillus. It is native to India and Sri Lanka.
