= Aelurillus desertus =

Scientific classification
- Kingdom: Animalia
- Phylum: Arthropoda
- Subphylum: Chelicerata
- Class: Arachnida
- Order: Araneae
- Infraorder: Araneomorphae
- Family: Salticidae
- Genus: Aelurillus
- Species: A. desertus

Binomial name
- Aelurillus desertus (Wesołowska & van Harten, 2010)

Species of spider

Aelurillus desertus is a species of jumping spider in the genus Aelurillus that is endemic to the United Arab Emirates. It was first describedin 2010 by Wanda Wesołowska and Antonius van Harten although initially only the male was described, the female following ten years later. The spider was originally classified in the genus Rafalus but was moved to its current genus at the same time as the female description was first published. The species is medium-sized with cephalothorax that is between 2.8 and 3.3 mm (0.11 and 0.13 in) long and an abdomen that is between 2.8 and 4.8 mm (0.11 and 0.19 in) long. The female is larger than the male. The carapace has a distinctive stripe. The female has three darker spots on the abdomen. The species can be distinguished by its copulatory organs, particularly the existence of a triangular lobe on the palpal bulb on the male and the way that the copulatory openings are close to the rear of the epigyne on the female.

== Taxonomy ==
Aelurillus desertus is a species of jumping spider, a member of the family Salticidae, that was first described by the arachnologist Wanda Wesołowska and Antonius van Harten in 2010. It is one of over 500 species identified by the Polish scientist Wesolowska in her career. The spider was initially placed in the genus Rafalus, named for the Polish arachnologist Jan Rafalski. The genus had been created by Jerzy Prószyński in 1999 based on the discovery of spiders that were related to the genus Aelurillus. The spider was subsequently transferred to Aelurillus in 2020 on the basis of the shape of the embolus and epigyne.

Aelurillus was first described by Eugène Simon in 1885. It was placed in the subtribe Aelurillina in the tribe Aelurillini, both named after the genus, by Wayne Maddison in 2015. These were allocated to the clade Saltafresia. In 2017, the genus was grouped with nine other genera of jumping spiders under the name Aelurillines. The genus name derives from the Greek word for cat. The species is named for the desert habitats of the United Arab Emirates.

== Description ==
The spider is medium-sized and hairy. The male has a cephalothorax that is between 2.8 and 3 mm (0.11 and 0.12 in) in length and 2.2 and 2.3 mm (0.087 and 0.091 in) in width. It has a brown striped elongated carapace, the hard upper part of the cephalothorax, with a pattern of two wide streaks made of white hairs that stretch from the back of the short dark eye field to the rear of the carapace. There are also white hairs on the edge of the carapace. The underside of the cephalothorax, or sternum, has a large dark brown spot but is otherwise light brown. The area of the spider's face Called its clypeus is brown with a few white hairs visible. While its mouthparts, including its labium and maxillae, are generally darker than the rest of the spider, its chelicerae are dark brown with dark hairs and two front teeth.

The abdomen is between 2.8 and 3 mm (0.11 and 0.12 in) long and 1.9 and 2 mm (0.075 and 0.079 in) wide. It is brown on top with a wide stripe across the middle, yellow on its sides, and yellow underneath. The top is hairy, the hairs getting denser and longer towards the front edge. Its spinnerets are light. The spider's legs have brown spots and are between dark yellow and orange in colour, although the front pair are darker than the others. They have greyish and brown leg hairs. The spider's copulatory organs are unusual. There are long white hairs on the light pedipalps and dark hairs on the cymbium. The tegulum has a complex shape, being large and convex with a distinctive small triangular lobe at it edge. The visible part of the embolus is very small, projecting a very short distance from the top of the tegulum.

The female was first described ten years after the male. It is slightly larger, with a cephalothorax that is 3.1 and 3.3 mm (0.12 and 0.13 in) long and 2.5 and 2.6 mm (0.098 and 0.102 in) wide and an abdomen 4.2 and 4.8 mm (0.17 and 0.19 in) long and 3.4 and 3.7 mm (0.13 and 0.15 in) wide. The female's carapace is darker and more clearly shaped like a pear. It has a scattering of long brown bristles amidst a covering of dense whitish hairs and a few white scales around the foremost eyes. The sternum is dark brown and has white hairs. Its chelicerae are brown and there are light tips at the end of the otherwise brownish labium and maxillae. Although similar in colour to the male, the female's abdomen is more swollen and has a marking of six darker spots. It is covered in whitish-grey hairs, again interspersed with a few long brown bristles. The underside of the abdomen is lighter than the topside. The legs are light brown and hairy.

The spider's pedipalps are hairy. The epigyne, the external visible part of the female's copulatory organs, has weak sclerotization, two 'hoods' made of membranes to the front, and two pockets towards the back. There are two copulatory openings that lead to relatively short insemination ducts. The spermathecae, or receptacles, have multiple chambers and are also sclerotized. The male can be distinguished from other species by the striped pattern on its abdomen and the triangular lobe on the palpal bulb. The female is best differentiated by looking at the copulatory openings, which are close to the rear of the epigyne unlike most spiders in the genus.

== Distribution ==
Aelurillus desertus is endemic to the United Arab Emirates. It was first found in the Emirate of Ajman, with the holotype collected in 2008. It has also been identified across much of the rest of the country, including Al Wathba Wetland Reserve in Abu Dhabi and Al Wasit in Sharjah, with specimens collected in 2010, 2014 and 2015.
