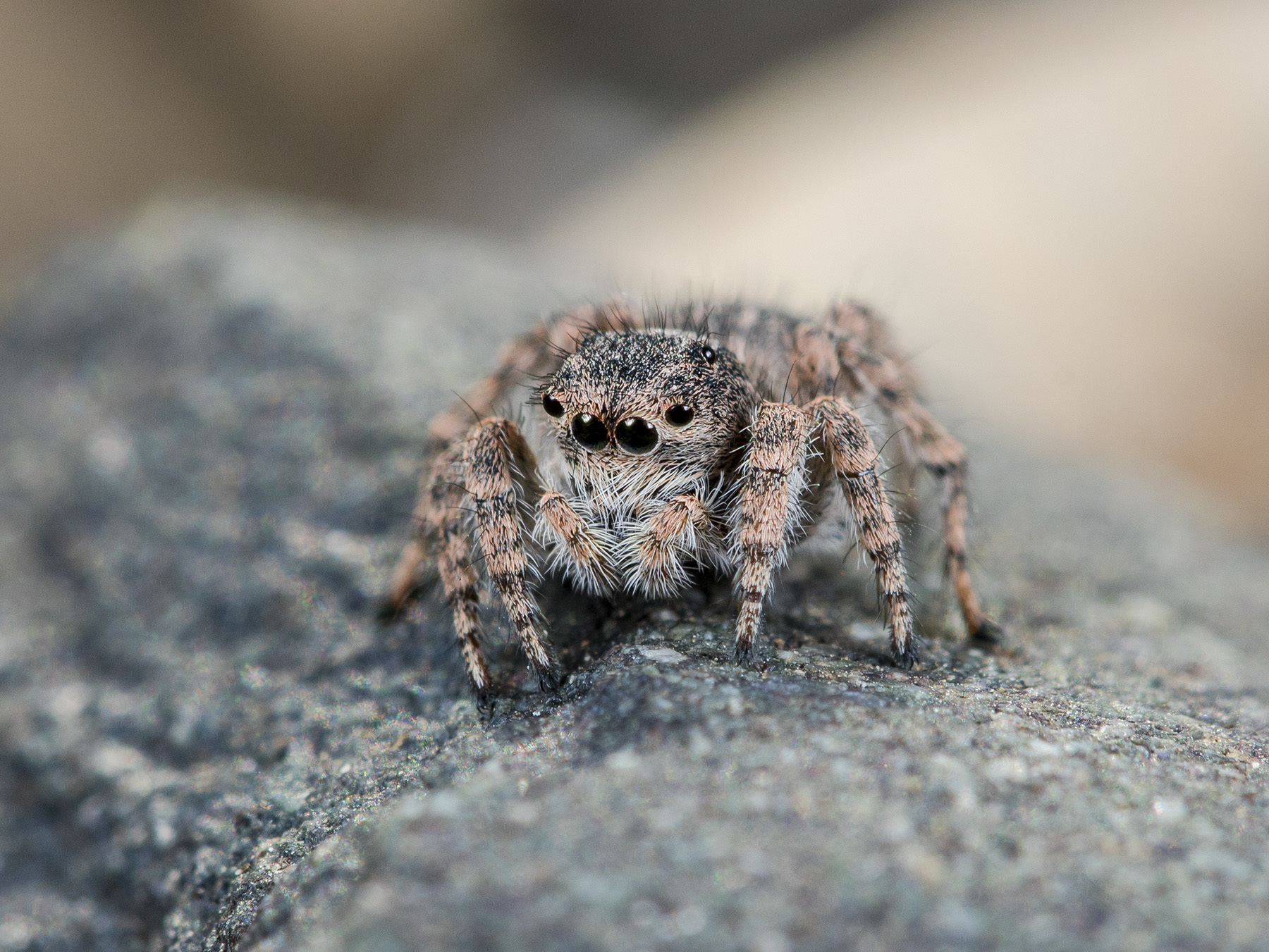
- Aelurillus dubatolovi

Scientific classification
- Kingdom: Animalia
- Phylum: Arthropoda
- Subphylum: Chelicerata
- Class: Arachnida
- Order: Araneae
- Infraorder: Araneomorphae
- Family: Salticidae
- Genus: Aelurillus
- Species: A. dubatolovi

Binomial name
- Aelurillus dubatolovi Azarkina, 2003

= Aelurillus dubatolovi =

Species of spider

Aelurillus dubatolovi is a species of jumping spider that lives in Central Asia. A member of the genus Aelurillus, the species was first identified in 2003 in Turkmenistan. It has a distribution that extends from Caspian Sea to Lake Balkhash and includes Kazakhstan, Kyrgyzstan, Tajikistan and Uzbekistan. The spider itself is small, the male being smaller than the female, with a carapace measuring between 3.1 and 3.6 mm (0.12 and 0.14 in) in length and an abdomen between 2.9 and 4.1 mm (0.11 and 0.16 in) long. The carapace is dark brown, with long hairs along the side that distinguish the species from the similar Aelurillus brutus and Aelurillus lutosus. It also has a hairy clypeus and palpal femora, which enables it to be identified as not being the otherwise similar Aelurillus ater. The female has a net-like pattern on the abdomen, which is clearer on examples found towards the northeast of the species distribution. The spiders found towards the northeast are also smaller, lighter and less hairy, but these are insufficient differences to identify them as a different species.

== Taxonomy and etymology ==
Aelurillus dubatolovi is a species of jumping spider, a member of the family Salticidae, that was first described by the arachnologist Galina Azarkina in 2003. It was placed in the genus Aelurillus, first circumscribed by Eugène Simon in 1885. The genus name derives from the Greek word for 'cat' and the species is named in honour of Vladimir Dubatolov, the Russian lepidopterologist that found many spiders in central Asia including the holotype of this species.

The genus Aelurillus was placed in the subtribe Aelurillina in the tribe Aelurillini, both named after the genus, by Wayne Maddison in 2015. These were allocated to the clade Saltafresia. In 2017, Jerzy Prószyński grouped the genus with nine other genera of jumping spiders under the name Aelurillines. It is closely related to the genus Manzuma and Rafalus, particularly in the shape of its body and the composition of its copulatory organs.

== Description ==
Aelurillus dubatolovi is a small spider with a body that consists of two parts, a forward section, or cephalothorax, and, behind that, its abdomen. The male has a dark brown carapace, the hard upper shell of the cephalothorax, that is typically 3.1 mm (0.12 in) long, 2.2 mm (0.087 in) wide and 1.6 mm (0.063 in) high, and covered with scales that are dark brown and white. Long dark hairs cover its sides. The eye field is black and white hairs surround some of the eyes. White hairs also adorn the brown clypeus, or cheeks. The spider has yellow-brown chelicerae. It has a yellowish-grey abdomen that a length of 2.9 mm (0.11 in) and width of 1.9 mm (0.075 in). Both the abdomen and carapace are pattern-less.

While the spider's book lung covers and spinnerets are grey-yellow, its legs are yellow-brown, although some of the legs have two yellow stripes on them. The femur on the spider's copulatory organs has a covering of greyish or brownish hairs. The palpal bulb is large and has a pointed embolus that curves around 180 degrees. The length of the embolus varies, with examples found in the northeastern part of the species range being longer and more curved. There is a large pointed and curved projection at the other end of the palpal bulb. There is also a blunt projection, or apophysis, on the palpal tibia.

The female is slightly larger than the male. The carapace is dark brown, similar to the male, but is larger at 3.6 mm (0.14 in) long and 2.5 mm (0.098 in) wide, and covered in black and white scales. The chelicerae and clypeus are brown like the male, and covered in white hairs. The abdomen is grey with a net-like pattern. It measures 4.1 mm (0.16 in) in length and 3.2 mm (0.13 in) in width. The spider has yellow-grey book lung covers. Its spinnerets are more brown in colour while the legs lack the stripes that feature on the male, and instead have dark patches. The female pedipalps are brownish. The epigyne has a central pocket and copulatory openings that are closely aligned. The spermathecae are long and have a complex curve and the palpal femora are hairy and has a distinctive outgrowth. Apart from the copulatory organs, the female is hard to distinguish from other members of the genus.

The spider is similar to others in the genus, particularly Aelurillus ater, from which it differs mainly in having hairs on the clypeus and palpal femora. It can also be confused with Aelurillus lutosus, which lacks the hairy carapace sides of the species. The spider differs from Aelurillus brutus in the lack of pattern on the bottom of the abdomen and the length of the hairs that line the carapace. Not unusually for this genus, the female is particularly hard to tell apart from spiders of other species.

== Distribution ==
The species has been given a species distribution that covers Central Asia, extending from the Caspian Sea to Lake Balkhash. The species holotype was collected by Vladimir Dubatolovin 1991 in the Köýtendag Nature Reserve in Turkmenistan at altitudes of between 1,800 and 2,500 m (5,900 and 8,200 ft) above sea level. It has also been found in Tajikistan, particularly the Karateginskiy and Mogoltau Mountains. Examples have been found in many areas of Kazakhstan, including the Karatau Mountains, as well as the Betpak-Dala and Moiynkum Deserts, demonstrating the breadth of habitats in which the species can survive. Examples found in 1983 and 1986 near Chong-Aryk in Kyrgyzstan have also been identified as belonging to the species. It has also been identified in the area around Tashkent and on the banks of the Angren in Uzbekistan and the Surxondaryo Region which borders both Tajikistan and Turkmenistan.

The examples found across the distribution vary, with those in the southwest being larger, more hairy and darker. The colour pattern is more distinct in those found in the northeast. However, other similarities led to Azarkina declaring them as being the same species.
