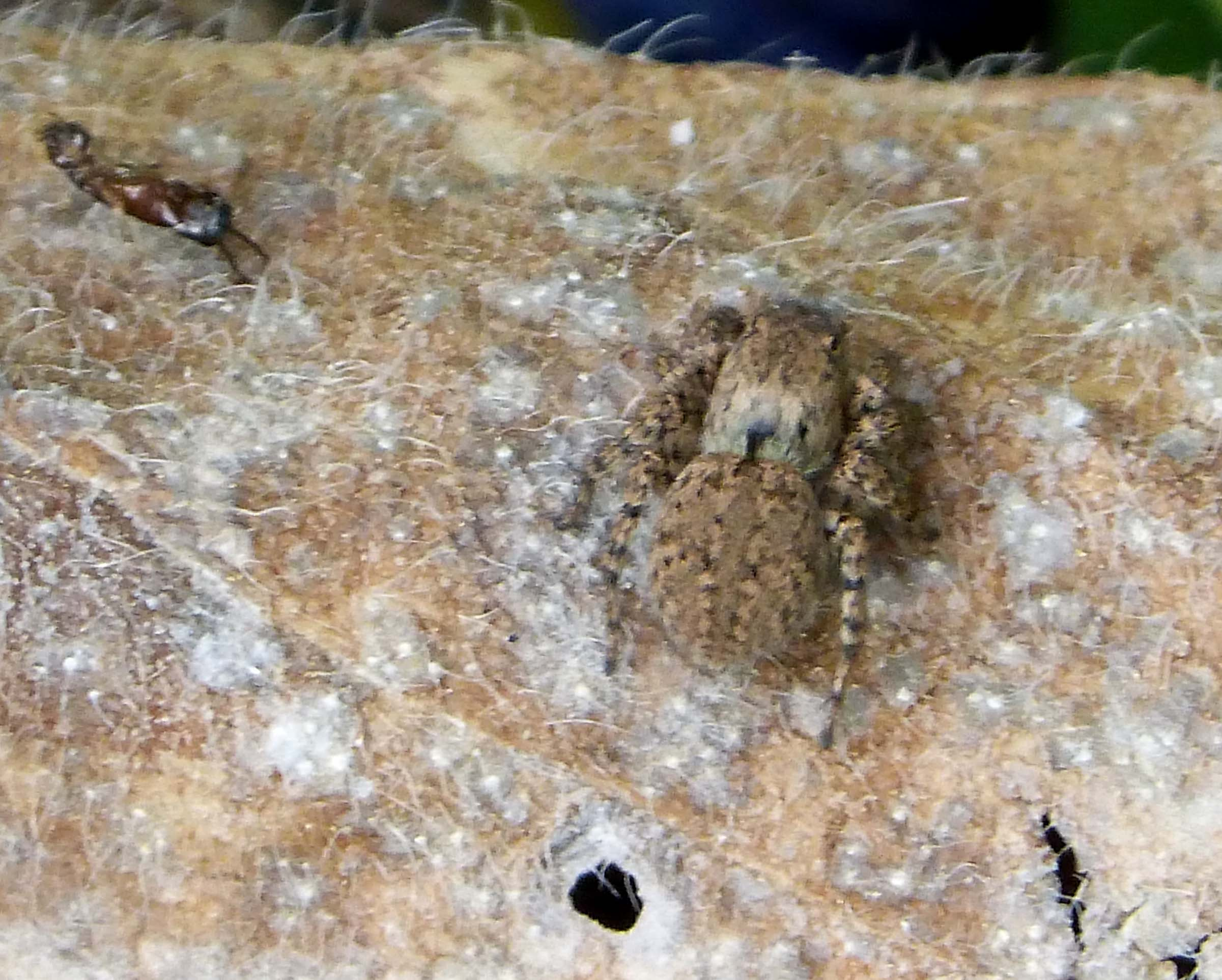
- A spider of the genus Aelurillus

Scientific classification
- Kingdom: Animalia
- Phylum: Arthropoda
- Subphylum: Chelicerata
- Class: Arachnida
- Order: Araneae
- Infraorder: Araneomorphae
- Family: Salticidae
- Genus: Aelurillus
- Species: A. basseleti

Binomial name
- Aelurillus basseleti (Lucas, 1846)

= Aelurillus basseleti =

Species of spider

Aelurillus basseleti is a species of jumping spider in the genus Aelurillus that has been found in Algeria, Morocco and Tunisia. Originally named Salticus basseleti, the spider was first identified in 1846 by Hippolyte Lucas, but the original male holotype has been lost. The female was first described in 2006. The spider is small and hard to distinguish from the related species Aelurillus luctuosus and Aelurillus monardi. The dark brown carapace is typically between 2.8 and 3.4 mm (0.11 and 0.13 in) long and the grey-yellow abdomen is between 2.3 and 4 mm (0.091 and 0.157 in) long, the female being larger than the male. The carapace has a single stripe down the middle. While the female is hard to distinguish compared to others in the genus, the male spider has distinctive white or tawny bands on the clypeus. The male has a curved embolus that is sufficiently varied between individual spiders that it is not sufficiently specific to identify the species.

== Taxonomy ==
Aelurillus basseleti is a species of jumping spider, a member of the family Salticidae, that was first described by the French arachnologist Hippolyte Lucas in 1846. It was initially named Salticus basseleti and allocated to the genus Salticus. The genus name was derived from the Latin word saltus, meaning something that jumps. In 1876, Eugène Simon moved the species to the genus Aelurops and then, in 1880, Pietro Pavesi moved it to the genus Ictidops before Simon finally moved it to Aelurillus in 1886. The genus Aelurillus was first described by Eugène Simon one year before, in 1885. The genus name derives from the Greek word for cat. It was placed in the subtribe Aelurillina in the tribe Aelurillini, both named after the genus, by Wayne Maddison in 2015. These were allocated to the clade Saltafresia. In 2017, the genus was grouped with nine other genera of jumping spiders under the name Aelurillines by Jerzy Prószyński.

== Description ==
Initially, only the male was described. The spider is small, about 6 mm (0.24 in) long. The male has a dark brown carapace that is typically 2.8 mm (0.11 in) long and 2 mm (0.079 in) wide. Two white stripes cross the otherwise black eye field and extend along the rest of the carapace. Its clypeus is brown and covered with dense hairs that are either white or tawny. The hairs form wide bands which are distinctive for the species. Its chelicerae are brown with short brown hairs.

The spider's abdomen is 2.3 mm (0.091 in) long and 1.7 mm (0.067 in) wide. It is grey-yellow on the top and has a brown underside with a wide white band across the middle. Its spinnerets are grey-brown and its legs are yellow. Its pedipalps are also yellow and have a covering of white hairs. The palpal bulb has two short tibial apophyses and distinctive blended appendages that extend from the middle. The tegulum is rounded with a long coiled embolus which has a hooked end. The shape of the embolus shows sufficient variation that it is not a distinguishing feature for the species.

The female was not described until 2006. It is large, with a carapace that is 3.4 mm (0.13 in) long and 2.6 mm (0.10 in) wide. It is similar in colour but has a covering of white and yellow scales that can form a pattern reminiscent of a net. The abdomen is also larger, with a length of 4.0 mm (0.16 in) and a width of 2.9 mm (0.11 in). It is similar in colour on the top, but the underside has a similar pattern of brown and white scales. Although the clypeus is similar in colour, much of the remaining features are darker. The chelicerae are darker brown, the spinnerets are brown-grey and the legs have dark brown patches on an otherwise brown background. Its epigyne has a pocket and short copulatory ducts.

The spider is typical of the genus and can be confused with other related species. It is superficially similar, particularly in its patterning. It can be distinguished from the related Aelurillus luctuosus and Aelurillus monardi by the band of hairs on the clypeus. The females are almost indistinguishable. Similarly, there is too large a variation in the male palpal bulb to enable clear differentiation.

== Distribution ==
Aelurillus spiders have a wide distribution, mainly in the Palearctic realm, with 34 living in the area around the Mediterranean Sea. Aelurillus basseleti has been found in Algeria, Morocco and Tunisia. The spider was first identified by Lucas in Constantine, Algeria. This holotype was subsequently lost. Examples have also been found in locations around the country including Zemmouri in 1984, El Harrach in 1985, Reghaïa in 1988 and Taghit in 1989. The spider has been found in Tunisia, first noted in Aïn Draham by Eugène Simon in 1885. It has been identified in Jendouba, Nabeul and Tunis. In 2003, Jerzy Prószyński described a male spider from the Levant, which he saw as another example of the species. However, when this example was re-examined by Galina Azarkina and Dmitri Logunov in 2006, it was found to be the related Aelurillus luctuosus. In 2013, Liviu Moscaliuc found the first example in Morocco, near Sidi Kaouki.

In terms of habitat, the spider inhabits a wide range of environments. Examples have been found in open grassland amongst flowering plants like Oxalis pes-caprae, in areas of shrubs like Cistus salviifolius, near to pools found in dunes, in palm groves and within plantations of cedar trees.
