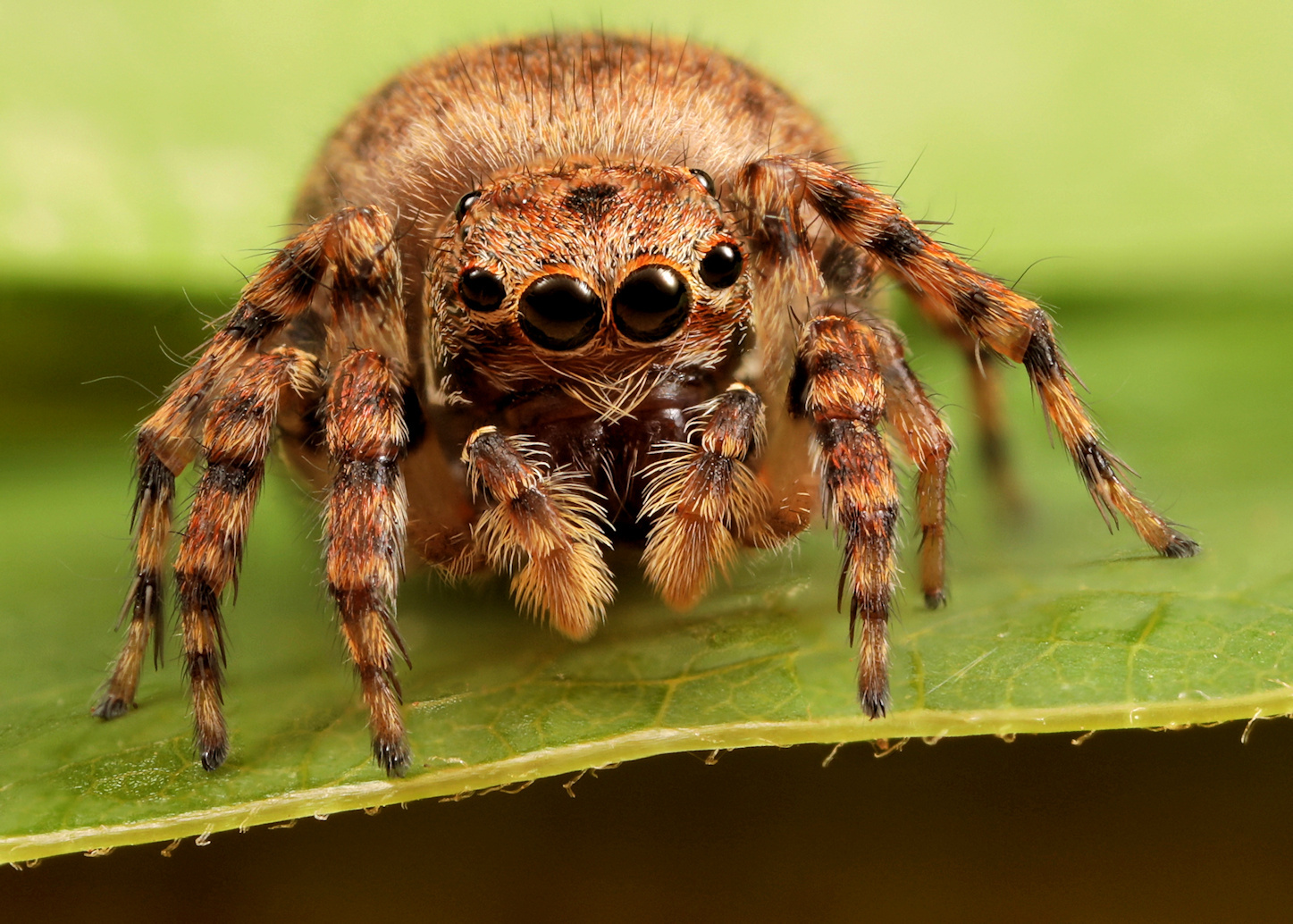
- Female
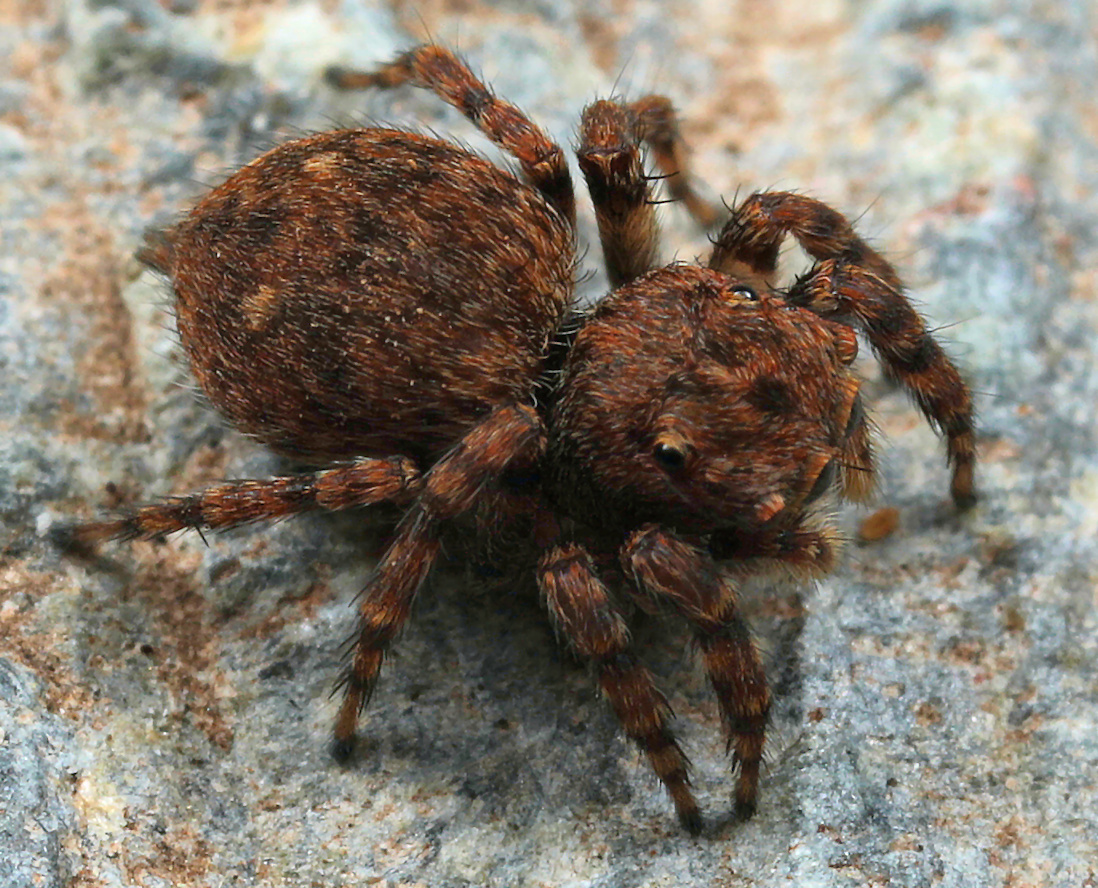
- Female

Scientific classification
- Kingdom: Animalia
- Phylum: Arthropoda
- Subphylum: Chelicerata
- Class: Arachnida
- Order: Araneae
- Infraorder: Araneomorphae
- Family: Salticidae
- Genus: Aelurillus
- Species: A. cristatopalpus

Binomial name
- Aelurillus cristatopalpus Simon, 1902

= Aelurillus cristatopalpus =

Species of spider

Aelurillus cristatopalpus is a species of jumping spider in the family Salticidae. It is endemic to South Africa.

== Distribution ==
Aelurillus cristatopalpus is found only in South Africa, where it has been recorded from Limpopo, North West, and Northern Cape provinces. Specific localities include Hoedspruit in Limpopo, Vryburg in North West, and Augrabies Falls National Park and Tswalu Game Reserve in the Northern Cape.

== Habitat and ecology ==
Aelurillus cristatopalpus is a ground-dwelling species sampled from pitfall traps in the Savanna Biome at altitudes ranging from 1155 to 1205 m.

== Description ==
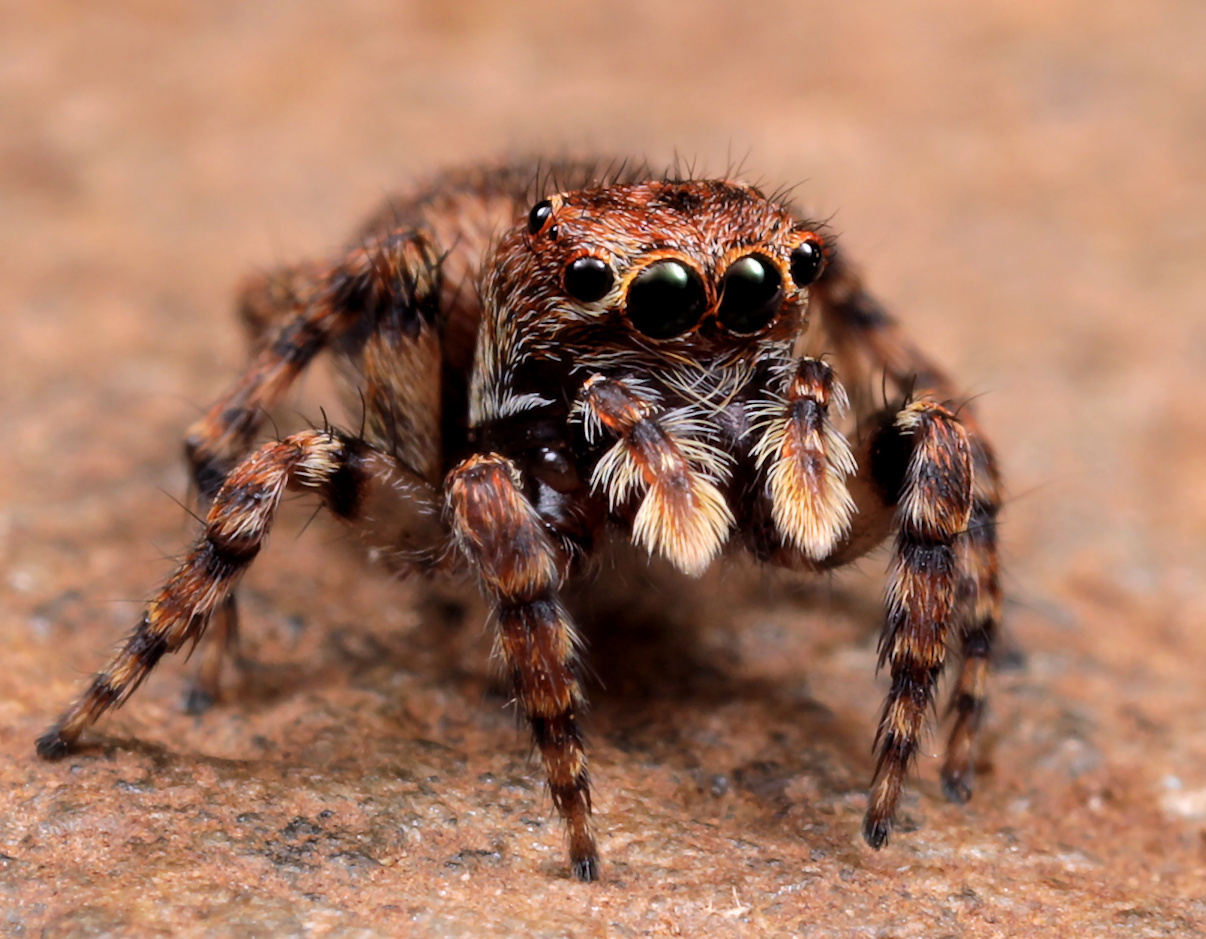
female

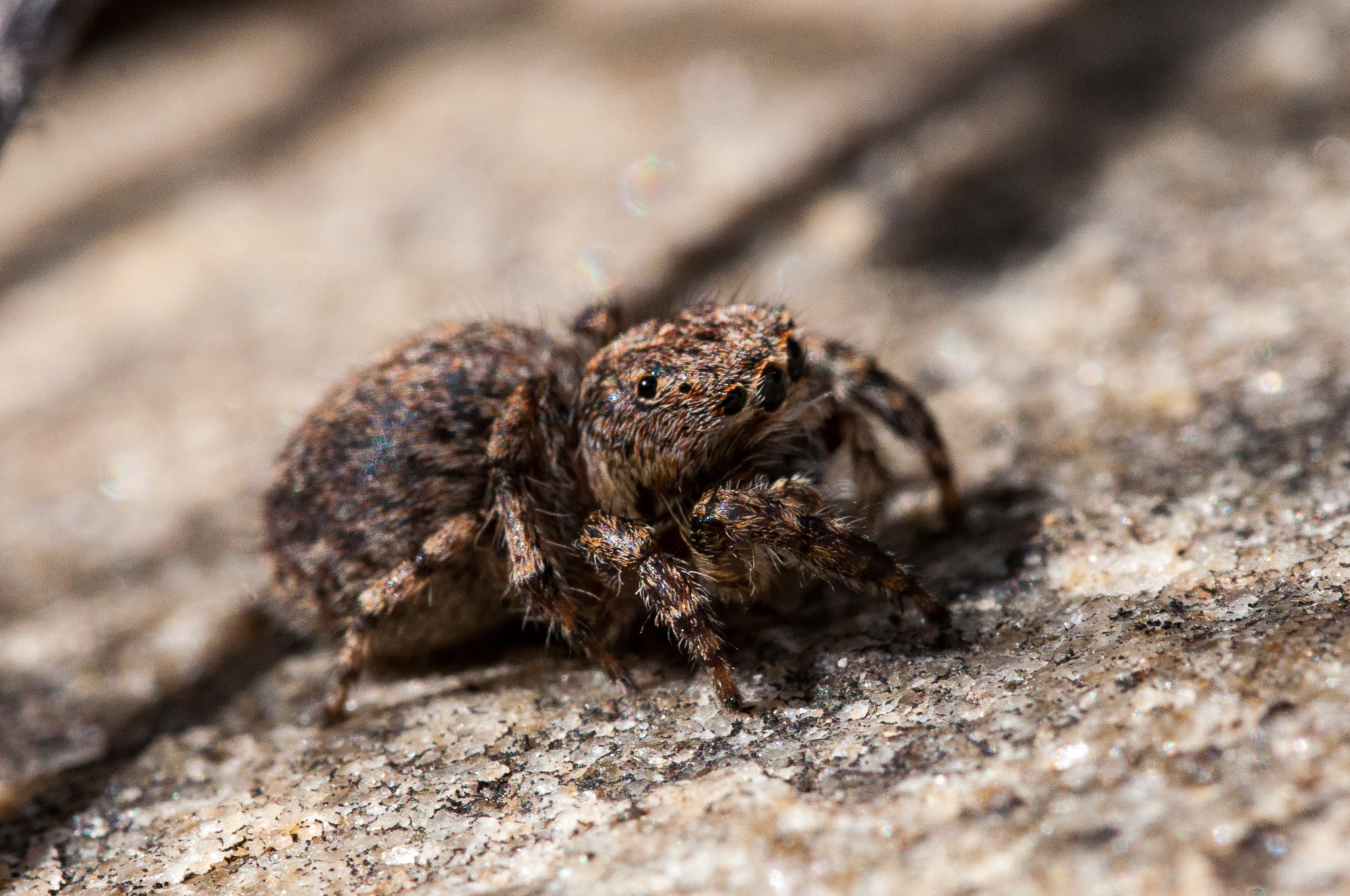
female

== Conservation ==
The species is listed as Data Deficient for taxonomic reasons by the South African National Biodiversity Institute. It is protected in Tswalu Game Reserve and Augrabies Falls National Park. Additional sampling is needed to collect female specimens and determine the full extent of the species' range.

== Taxonomy ==
Aelurillus cristatopalpus was originally described by Eugène Simon in 1902 from Vryburg in the North West. Both sexes were described in the original description, but according to Clark, the female type is immature. The species has not been revised since its original description.
