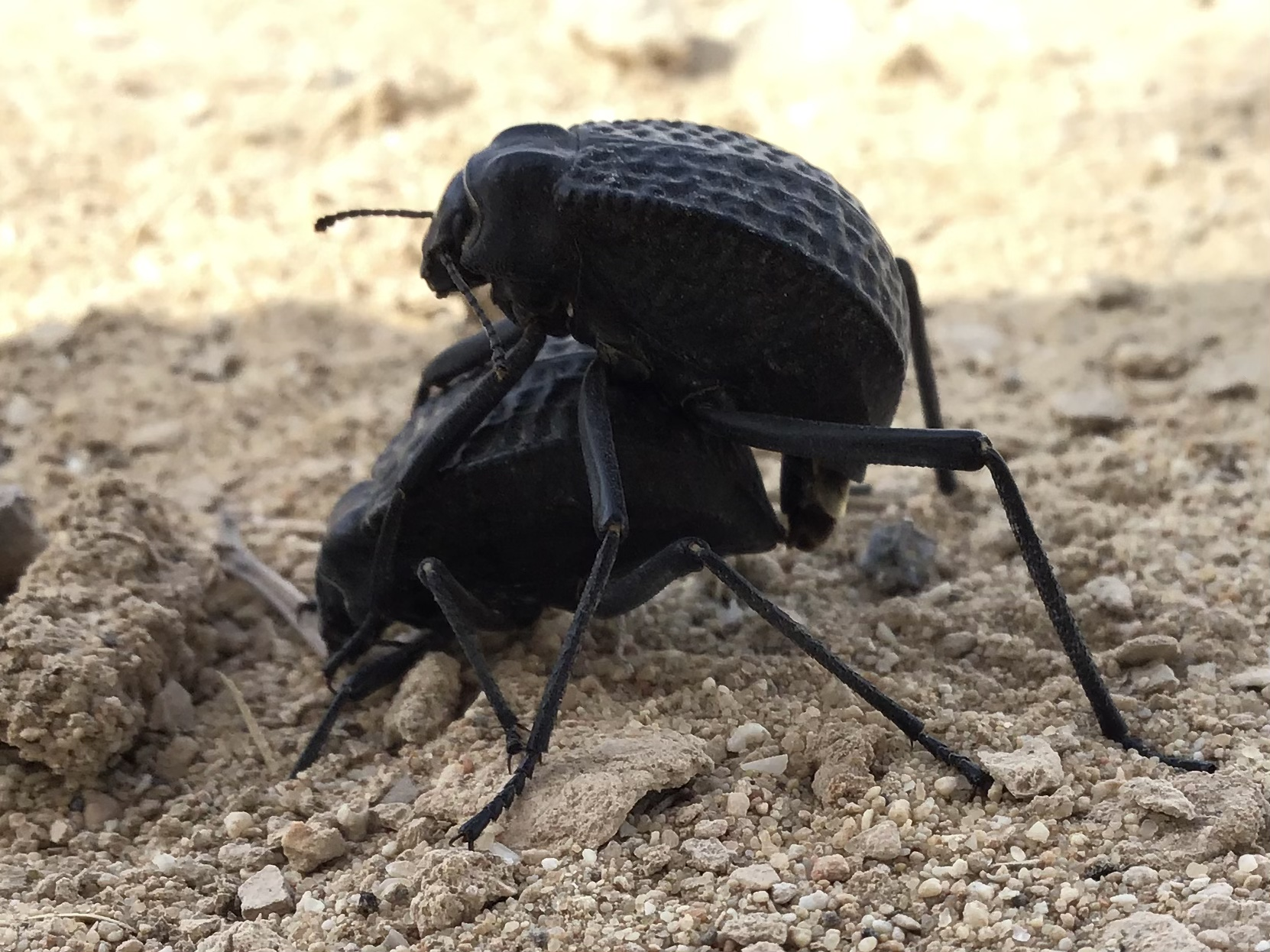
- Male (top) and female (below) individuals of Adesmia cancellata

Scientific classification
- Domain: Eukaryota
- Kingdom: Animalia
- Phylum: Arthropoda
- Class: Insecta
- Order: Coleoptera
- Suborder: Polyphaga
- Infraorder: Cucujiformia
- Family: Tenebrionidae
- Genus: Adesmia
- Species: A. cancellata

Binomial name
- Adesmia cancellata Klug, 1830

= Adesmia cancellata =

Species of beetle

Adesmia cancellata, the pitted beetle, is a species of desert beetle of the Tenebrionidae family that inhabits arid environments in the Middle East.

It was first formally described by the entomologist Johann Christoph Friedrich Klug in 1830.
