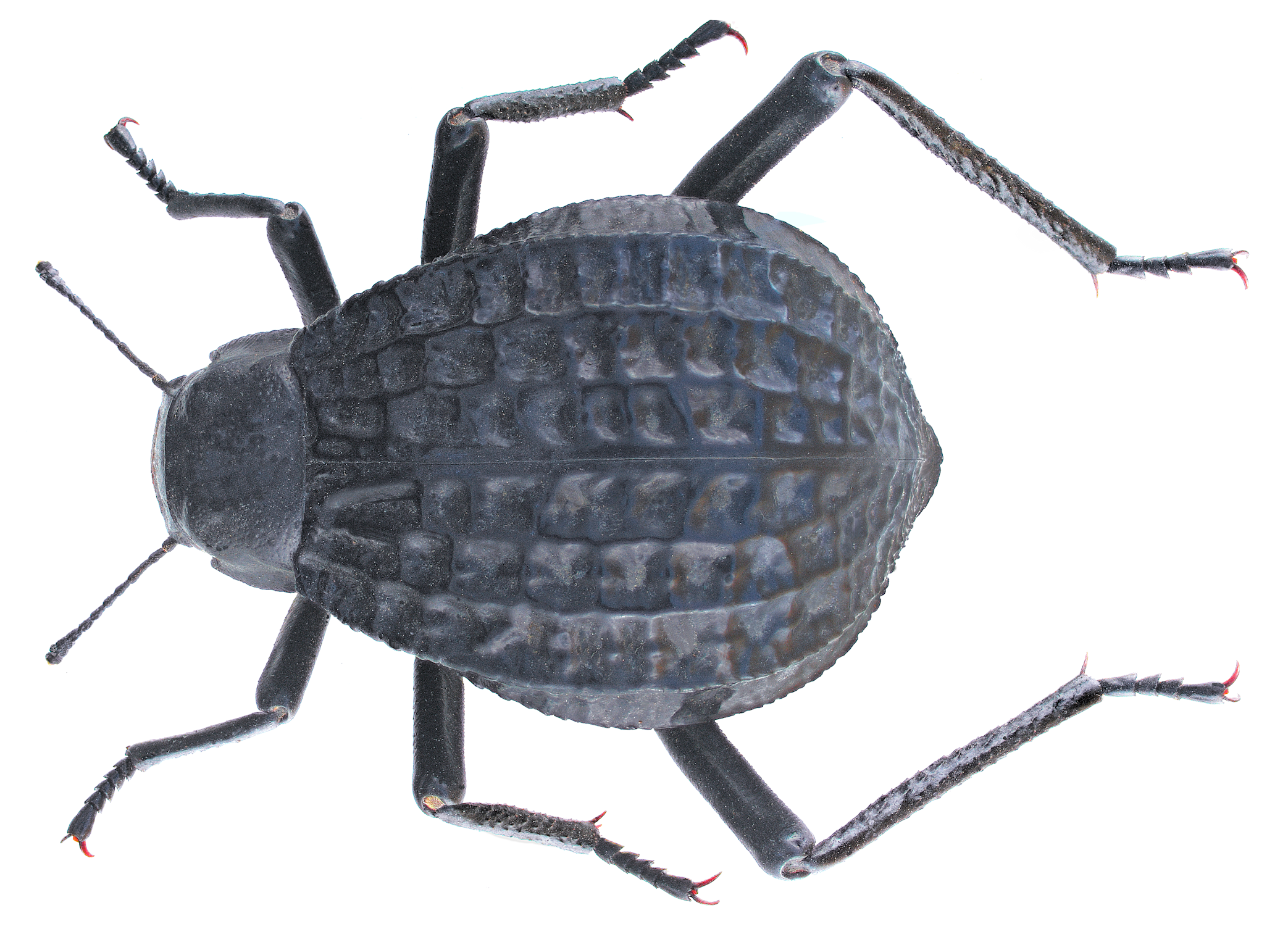

Scientific classification
- Domain: Eukaryota
- Kingdom: Animalia
- Phylum: Arthropoda
- Class: Insecta
- Order: Coleoptera
- Suborder: Polyphaga
- Infraorder: Cucujiformia
- Family: Tenebrionidae
- Tribe: Adesmiini
- Genus: Adesmia; Fisher

= Adesmia (beetle) =

Genus of beetles

Adesmia is a genus of beetles in the family Tenebrionidae. This includes the pitted beetle.

== Species ==
- Adesmia boyeri
- Adesmia cancellata
- Adesmia maillei
