= Aelurillus aeruginosus =

Scientific classification
- Kingdom: Animalia
- Phylum: Arthropoda
- Subphylum: Chelicerata
- Class: Arachnida
- Order: Araneae
- Infraorder: Araneomorphae
- Family: Salticidae
- Genus: Aelurillus
- Species: A. aeruginosus

Binomial name
- Aelurillus aeruginosus (Simon, 1871)

Species of spider

Aelurillus aeruginosus is a jumping spider that feeds on ants.

== Distribution ==
A. aeruginosus occurs in the Mediterranean, for example in Sicily, Spain and the Levant (Israel, Syria).
