= Aelurillus guecki =

Scientific classification
- Kingdom: Animalia
- Phylum: Arthropoda
- Subphylum: Chelicerata
- Class: Arachnida
- Order: Araneae
- Infraorder: Araneomorphae
- Family: Salticidae
- Genus: Aelurillus
- Species: A. guecki

Binomial name
- Aelurillus guecki Metzner, 1999

Species of spider

Aelurillus guecki is a species of jumping spider in the genus Aelurillus that lives in Greece and Turkey. It was first described in 1999.
