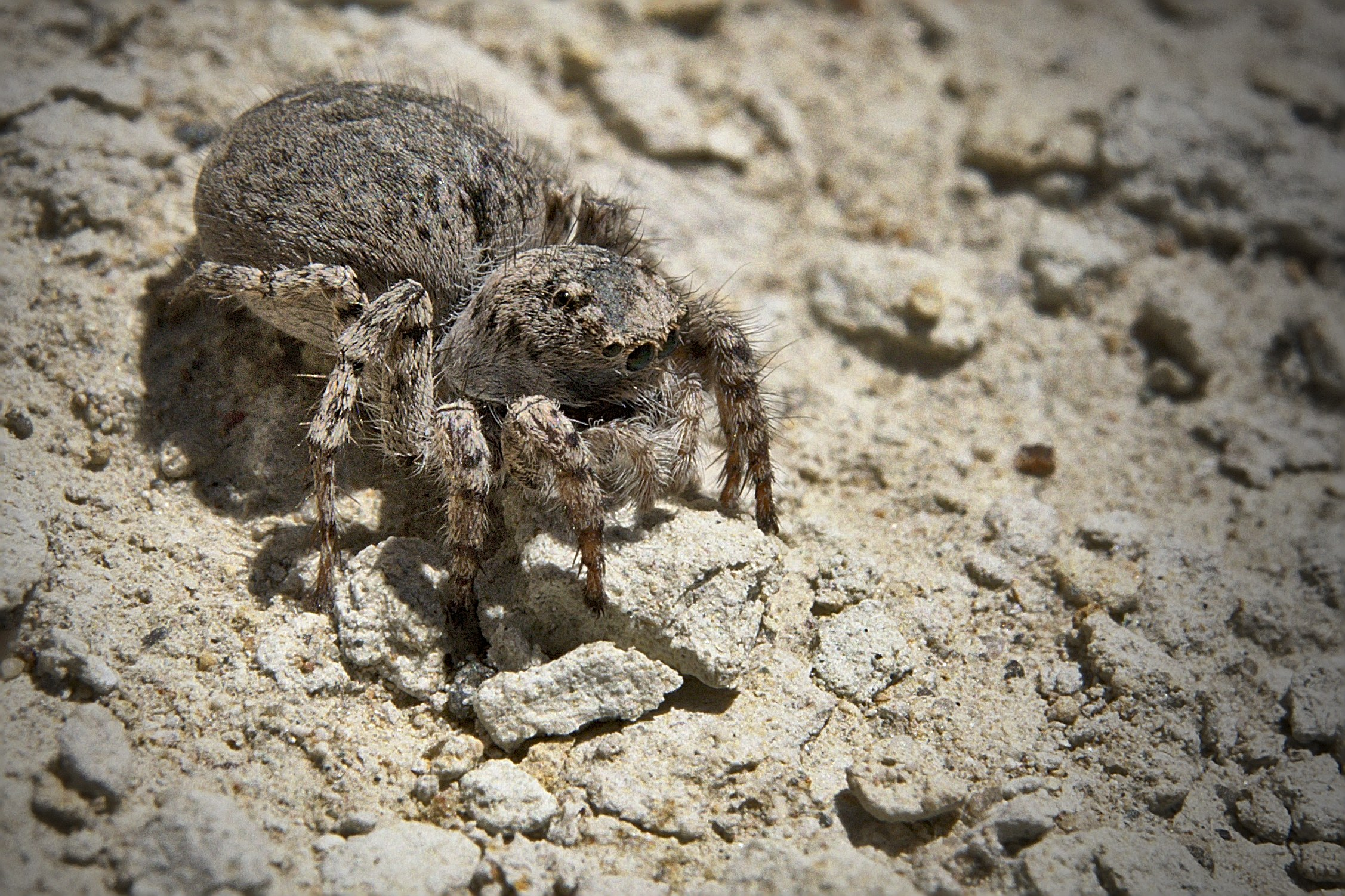
- female (Crete, 2015)

Scientific classification
- Kingdom: Animalia
- Phylum: Arthropoda
- Subphylum: Chelicerata
- Class: Arachnida
- Order: Araneae
- Infraorder: Araneomorphae
- Family: Salticidae
- Genus: Aelurillus
- Species: A. leipoldae

Binomial name
- Aelurillus leipoldae (Metzner, 1999)

= Aelurillus leipoldae =

Species of spider

Aelurillus leipoldae is a species of jumping spider that lives on the island of Crete in Greece.
