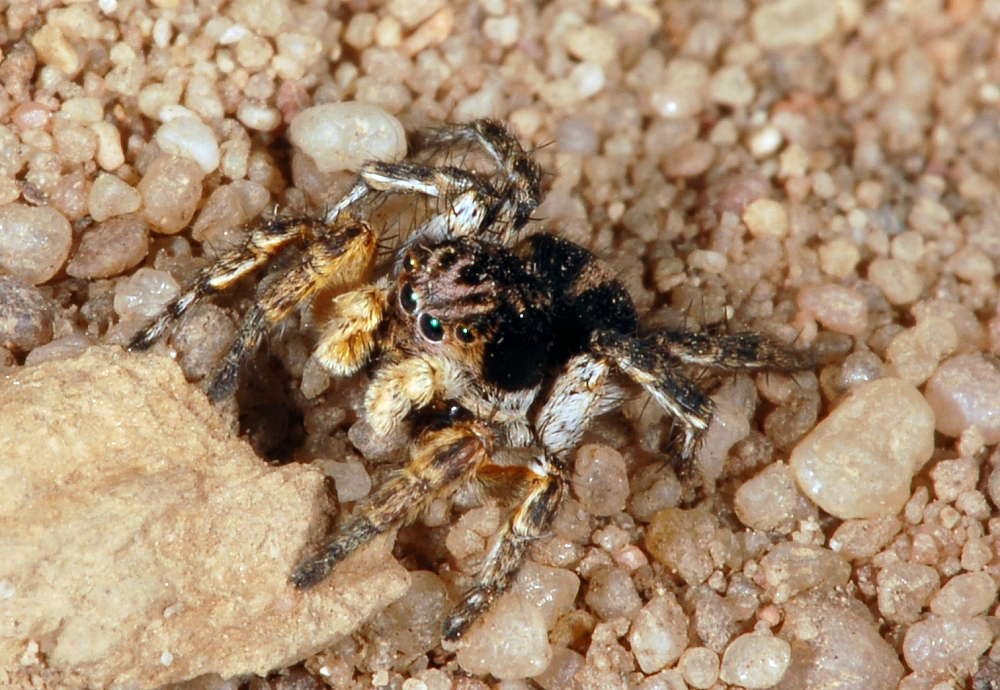
- male A. v-insignitus

Scientific classification
- Kingdom: Animalia
- Phylum: Arthropoda
- Subphylum: Chelicerata
- Class: Arachnida
- Order: Araneae
- Infraorder: Araneomorphae
- Family: Salticidae
- Subfamily: Salticinae
- Genus: Aelurillus; Simon, 1885

Type species
- Araneus litera v-insignitus Clerck, 1757

Species
- See text

Diversity
- 72 species

= Aelurillus =

Genus of spiders

Aelurillus is a genus of spiders in the family Salticidae (jumping spiders).

== Distribution ==
Species of the genus Aelurillus occur in the Palaearctic and Africa, with a few species known from India (A. improvisus, A. minimontanus) and Sri Lanka (A. kronestedti, A. quadrimaculatus). Aelurillus subfestivus is found in Japan.

== Description ==
Species of the genus Aelurillus are typically about 7 mm long in females, and up to five mm in males. They are stout, squat-shaped and rather furry, with females often uniformly mottled sandy brown, while males are often black, sometimes with a pattern and with light, annulated legs.

== Habits ==
Spiders in this genus mainly catch and feed on ants (myrmecophagy).

A Southeast Asian species of the genus Aelurillus has been observed to jump around 30-40 times its body length straight onto the back of a large gnaphosid spider and kill it.

They like hot, dry, stony places or small bare open areas with dead twigs or similar amongst low vegetation.

== Species ==
As of October 2025, this genus includes 72 species and two subspecies:

- Aelurillus aeruginosus (Simon, 1871) – Mediterranean
- Aelurillus afghanus Azarkina, 2006 – Afghanistan, Pakistan
- Aelurillus alboclypeus Azarkina & Komnenov, 2015 – Turkey
- Aelurillus ambiguus (Denis, 1966) – Libya
- Aelurillus andreevae Nenilin, 1984 – Turkmenistan, Tajikistan
- Aelurillus angularis Prószyński, 2000 – Israel
- Aelurillus ater (Kroneberg, 1875) – Kazakhstan, Uzbekistan, Turkmenistan, Kyrgyzstan, Tajikistan
- Aelurillus balearus Azarkina, 2006 – Canary Islands, Spain (Balearic Is.)
- Aelurillus basseleti (Lucas, 1846) – Morocco, Algeria, Tunisia
- Aelurillus blandus (Simon, 1871) – Portugal, Spain, Greece, Cyprus, Morocco
- Aelurillus bokerinus Prószyński, 2003 – Israel
- Aelurillus bosmansi Azarkina, 2006 – Spain
- Aelurillus brutus Wesołowska, 1996 – Turkmenistan, Kazakhstan
- Aelurillus catherinae Prószyński, 2000 – Egypt
- Aelurillus catus Simon, 1886 – Senegal
- Aelurillus cognatus (O. Pickard-Cambridge, 1872) – Lebanon
- Aelurillus concolor Kulczyński, 1901 – Greece, North Macedonia, Turkey, Caucasus, Kazakhstan, Iran, Central Asia
- Aelurillus conveniens (O. Pickard-Cambridge, 1872) – Egypt, Israel, Syria
- Aelurillus cretensis Azarkina, 2002 – Greece (Crete)
- Aelurillus cristatopalpus Simon, 1902 – South Africa
- Aelurillus cypriotus Azarkina, 2006 – Cyprus
- Aelurillus deltshevi Azarkina & Komnenov, 2015 – North Macedonia, Bulgaria, Azerbaijan
- Aelurillus desertus (Wesołowska & van Harten, 2010) – United Arab Emirates
- Aelurillus dubatolovi Azarkina, 2003 – Kazakhstan, Central Asia
- Aelurillus faragallai Prószyński, 1993 – Saudi Arabia, Yemen
- Aelurillus galinae Wesołowska & van Harten, 2010 – United Arab Emirates
- Aelurillus gershomi Prószyński, 2000 – Israel, Jordan
- Aelurillus guecki Metzner, 1999 – Greece, Turkey
- Aelurillus helvenacius Logunov, 1993 – Mongolia
- Aelurillus hirtipes Denis, 1960 – North Africa
- Aelurillus improvisus Azarkina, 2002 – India
- Aelurillus jerusalemicus Prószyński, 2000 – Israel
- Aelurillus khorasanicus Azarkina & Mirshamsi, 2014 – Iran
- Aelurillus kochi Roewer, 1951 – Greece, Israel, Syria, United Arab Emirates
- Aelurillus kopetdaghi Wesołowska, 1996 – Turkmenistan
- Aelurillus kronestedti Azarkina, 2004 – India, Sri Lanka
- Aelurillus laniger Logunov & Marusik, 2000 – North Macedonia, Kazakhstan
- Aelurillus latebricola Spassky, 1941 – Tajikistan
- Aelurillus leipoldae (Metzner, 1999) – Greece (Crete)
- Aelurillus logunovi Azarkina, 2004 – Afghanistan, Pakistan
- Aelurillus lopadusae Cantarella, 1983 – Italy, Algeria
- Aelurillus lucasi Roewer, 1951 – Canary Islands, Salvages
- Aelurillus luctuosus (Lucas, 1846) – Mediterranean to Turkmenistan
- Aelurillus lutosus (Tystshenko, 1965) – Russia (Europe, Caucasus), Kazakhstan, Kyrgyzstan
- Aelurillus m-nigrum Kulczyński, 1891 – South-eastern Europe, Russia (Europe to Central Asia), Caucasus, Iran, Kazakhstan, Central Asia, China
- Aelurillus madagascariensis Azarkina, 2009 – Madagascar
- Aelurillus marusiki Azarkina, 2002 – Iran
- Aelurillus minimontanus Azarkina, 2002 – India
- Aelurillus minutus Azarkina, 2002 – Syria, Eritrea
- Aelurillus mirabilis Wesołowska, 2006 – Namibia
- Aelurillus monardi (Lucas, 1846) – Mediterranean
- Aelurillus murphyorum Azarkina, 2022 – Kenya
- Aelurillus nabataeus Prószyński, 2003 – Israel, Jordan
- Aelurillus nenilini Azarkina, 2002 – Kazakhstan, Turkmenistan, Uzbekistan
- Aelurillus numidicus (Lucas, 1846) – Algeria
- Aelurillus plumipes (Thorell, 1875) – Algeria, Tunisia
- Aelurillus politiventris (O. Pickard-Cambridge, 1872) – Greece to Israel
- Aelurillus quadrimaculatus Simon, 1889 – India, Sri Lanka
- Aelurillus quercussuber Wunderlich, 2023 – Portugal
- Aelurillus rugatus (Bösenberg & Lenz, 1895) – Tanzania
- Aelurillus russellsmithi Azarkina, 2009 – Ivory Coast, Ghana
- Aelurillus schembrii Cantarella, 1982 – Italy (mainland, Sicily), Malta
- Aelurillus simplex (Herman, 1879) – Hungary
- Aelurillus spinicrus (Simon, 1871) – Morocco
- Aelurillus steinmetzi Metzner, 1999 – Croatia, Greece
- Aelurillus subaffinis Caporiacco, 1947 – Eritrea
- Aelurillus subfestivus Saito, 1934 – Japan
- Aelurillus thailandicus Azarkina, 2019 – Thailand
- Aelurillus tumidulus Wesołowska & Tomasiewicz, 2008 – Ethiopia
- Aelurillus unitibialis Azarkina, 2002 – Iran
- Aelurillus v-insignitus (Clerck, 1757) – Europe, Turkey, Caucasus, Russia (Europe to Far East), Kazakhstan, Central Asia, China (type species)
  - A. v. morulus (Simon, 1937) – France
  - A. v. obsoletus Kulczyński, 1891 – Czech Republic, Hungary, Romania
- Aelurillus westi Azarkina & Zamani, 2019 – Iran
