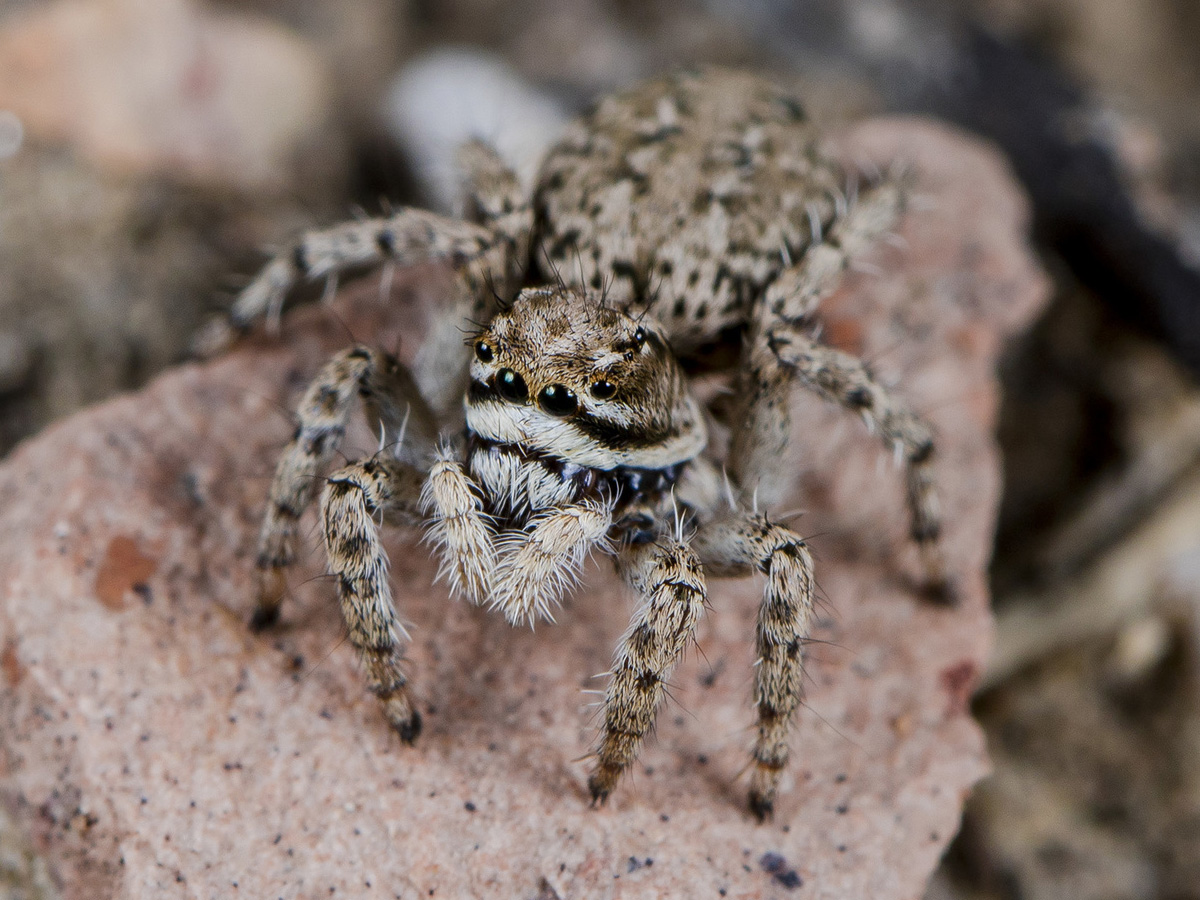
- Rafalus variegatus in Almaty Region, Kazakhstan

Scientific classification
- Kingdom: Animalia
- Phylum: Arthropoda
- Subphylum: Chelicerata
- Class: Arachnida
- Order: Araneae
- Infraorder: Araneomorphae
- Family: Salticidae
- Subfamily: Salticinae
- Genus: Rafalus; Prószyński, 1999

Type species
- R. christophori Prószyński, 1999

Species
- 12, see text

= Rafalus =

Genus of spiders

Rafalus is a genus of jumping spiders that was first described by Jerzy Prószyński in 1999.

== Species ==
As of August 2019 it contains twelve species, found only in Africa and Asia:

- Rafalus arabicus Wesolowska & van Harten, 2010 – United Arab Emirates
- Rafalus christophori Prószyński, 1999 (type) – Egypt, Israel
- Rafalus desertus Wesolowska & van Harten, 2010 – United Arab Emirates
- Rafalus feliksi Prószyński, 1999 – Egypt, United Arab Emirates
- Rafalus insignipalpis (Simon, 1882) – Yemen (mainland, Socotra)
- Rafalus karskii Prószyński, 1999 – Israel
- Rafalus lymphus (Próchniewicz & Hęciak, 1994) – Kenya, Tanzania, Ethiopia, Yemen
- Rafalus minimus Wesolowska & van Harten, 2010 – United Arab Emirates
- Rafalus nigritibiis (Caporiacco, 1941) – Ethiopia
- Rafalus stanislawi Prószyński, 1999 – Israel
- Rafalus variegatus (Kroneberg, 1875) – Iran, Central Asia
- Rafalus wittmeri (Prószyński, 1978) – Bhutan
