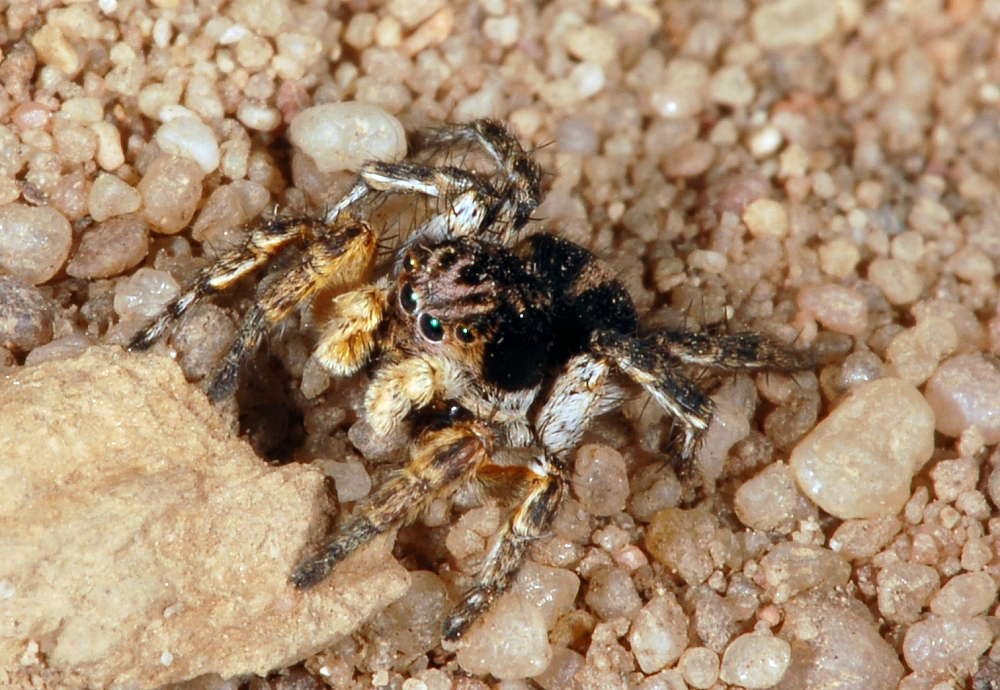
- male

Scientific classification
- Kingdom: Animalia
- Phylum: Arthropoda
- Subphylum: Chelicerata
- Class: Arachnida
- Order: Araneae
- Infraorder: Araneomorphae
- Family: Salticidae
- Genus: Aelurillus
- Species: A. v-insignitus

Binomial name
- Aelurillus v-insignitus (Clerck, 1757)

Synonyms
- Araneus litera v insignitus Araneus litera v notatus Aranea navaria Aranea insignita Aranea punctata Aranea litterata Attus litteratus Attus quinquepartitus Attus insignitus Salticus quinquepartitus Euophrys quinquepartitus Attus quinquefidus Dia quinquepartita Salticus nidicolens Attus v-insignitus Pandora litterata Dia quinquefida Euophrys insignitus Yllenus v-insignitus Aelurops insignitus Aelurops v-insignitus Ictidops v-insignitus Aelurillus insignitus Phlegra v-insignita Phlegra v-insignitus

= Aelurillus v-insignitus =

Species of spider

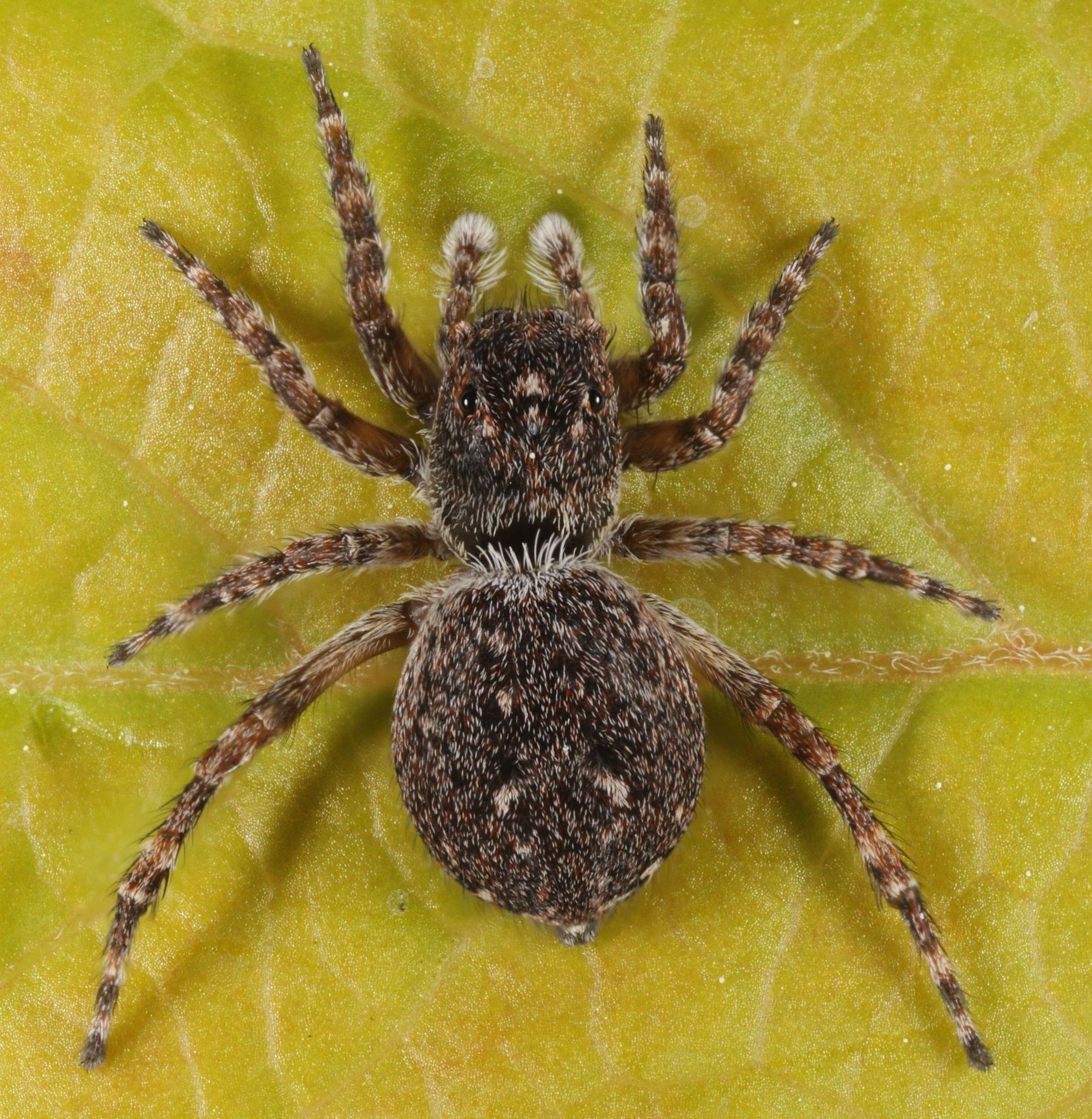
Adult female

Aelurillus v-insignitus is a species of jumping spiders.

== Appearance ==
The male has v-shaped rows of hairs on its head and a pronounced white median stripe on its abdomen. The female is mottled brown. The spider can reach a length of 4–7 millimetres (0.16–0.28 in).

== Name ==
Insignitus is Latin for "signed", because of the white chevron on the back of the male spider, which is in the form of the letter "V". This letter was originally spelled one v above another V, which could also be interpreted as a double V or W, but usually is interpreted as "V".

== Distribution ==
A. v-insignitus occurs in the Palaearctic. It is the only Aelurillus species that occurs in northwestern Europe.
