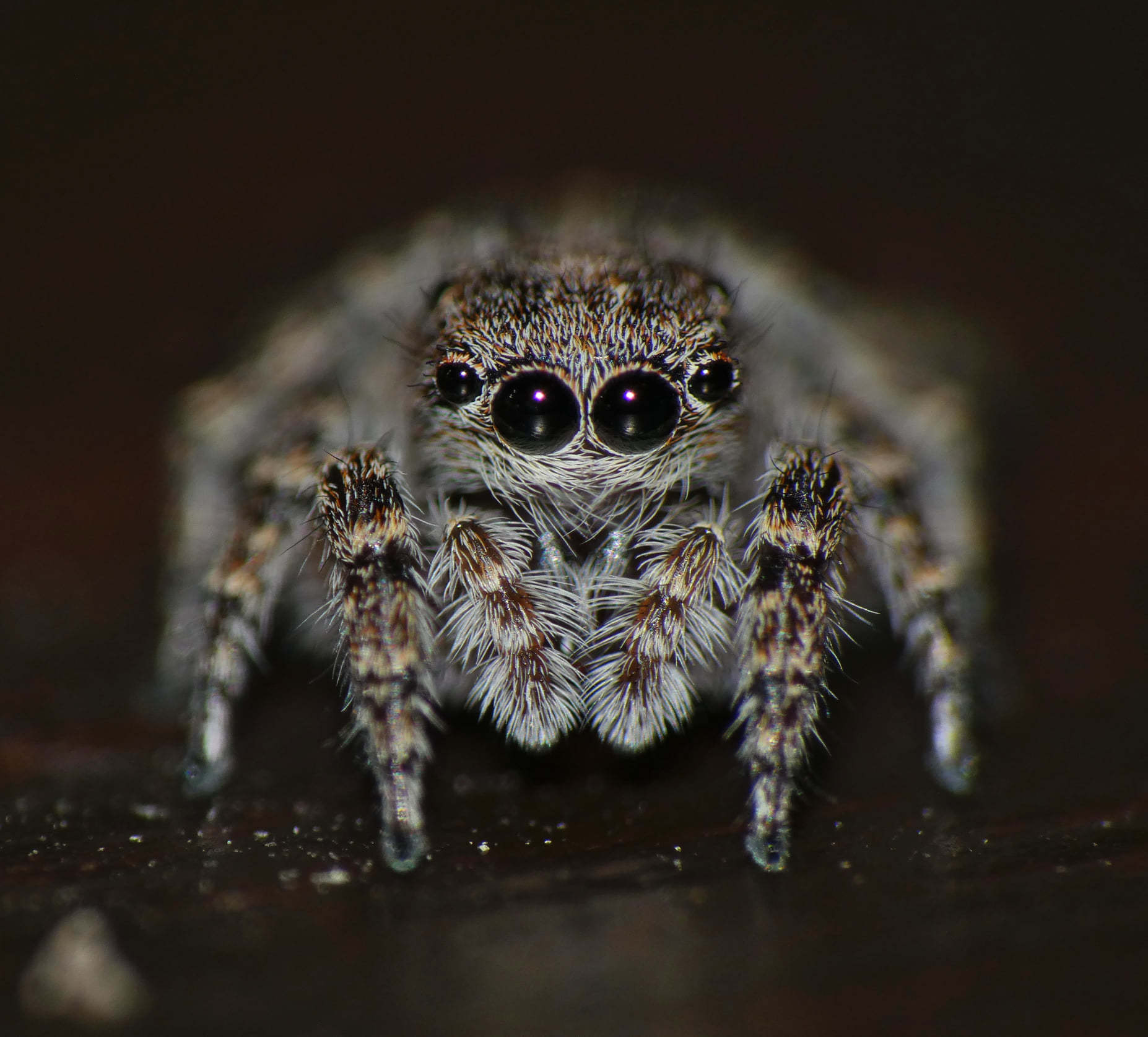
- A spider of the Langelurillus genus

Scientific classification
- Kingdom: Animalia
- Phylum: Arthropoda
- Subphylum: Chelicerata
- Class: Arachnida
- Order: Araneae
- Infraorder: Araneomorphae
- Family: Salticidae
- Genus: Langelurillus
- Species: L. furcatus

Binomial name
- Langelurillus furcatus Wesołowska & Russell-Smith, 2000

= Langelurillus furcatus =

Species of spider

Langelurillus furcatus is a species of jumping spider in the genus Langelurillus that lives in Kenya and Tanzania. It was first described in 2000 by Wanda Wesołowska and Anthony Russell-Smith. The spider is small, with a carapace that is between 1.8 and 2.4 mm (0.071 and 0.094 in) long and an abdomen between 1.7 and 2.7 mm (0.067 and 0.106 in) long. The male is smaller than the female. It has a dark brown carapace, although the female is lighter, that has no markings. The female abdomen is dark russet with a pattern of black and white patches and the male abdomen is dark fawn with an indistinct light pattern. It has orange legs with dark patches, the female also having dark rings on its legs. The spider is similar to other related species, particularly Langelurillus alboguttatus, but can be distinguished by its two tibial apophysis, which make a V-shape. The epigyne has a deep depression that is plugged with a waxy secretion.

== Taxonomy ==
Langelurillus furcatus is a jumping spider that was first described by Wanda Wesołowska and Anthony Russell-Smith in 2000. It was one of over 500 species identified by the Polish arachnologist during her career. It was allocated it to the genus Langelurillus, which had been raised by Maciej Próchniewicz in 1994. The genus is related to Aelurillus and Langona but the spiders are smaller and, unlike these genera and Phlegra, they lack the parallel stripes on the back of the body that is feature of the majority of these spiders. In 2015, Wayne Maddison listed the genus in the subtribe Aelurillina, which also contains Aelurillus, Langona and Phlegra, in the tribe Aelurillini, within the subclade Saltafresia in the clade Salticoida. In 2016, Jerzy Prószyński placed the same genera in a group named Aelurillines based on the shape of the spiders' copulatory organs. The species is named after a Latin word that means forked.

== Description ==
Langelurillus furcatus is a small spider. The male has a high, dark brown carapace that is typically 1.8 mm (0.071 in) long and 1.4 mm (0.055 in) wide. The short eye field has long brown bristles. The chelicerae are light brown and hairy with two very small teeth visible to the front. The labium is yellowish. The abdomen is similar in size to the carapace, typically 1.7 mm (0.067 in) long and 1.3 mm (0.051 in) wide, and more elongated. It is dark fawn and covered with brown hairs, with a lighter pattern vaguely visible on the back. The underside is yellowish-grey. The legs are orange with large dark patches, and have brown leg hairs and spines. The pedipalps are squat and have two tibial apophysis, or spikes, aligned in a V-shape. The coiled embolus is hidden behind a shield.

The female has a rather high carapace that is larger than the male, between 2.2 and 2.4 mm (0.087 and 0.094 in) long and 1.7 and 1.9 mm (0.067 and 0.075 in) wide, with a short black eye field takes up nearly a third. It is covered in black hairs but is otherwise lighter than the male. It has a brown clypeus. The brown chelicerae lack any teeth although the labium is yellowish like the male. The abdomen is also larger than the male, measuring between 2.4 and 2.7 mm (0.094 and 0.106 in) in length and 2.1 and 2.6 mm (0.083 and 0.102 in) in width. It is dark russet on the top with a pattern of irregular patches of black and white, and covered in brown hairs. The hairs are denser to the front. The bottom of the abdomen is light with dark dots. The spider has rather short legs, which are generally orange and marked with dark rings and patches. The leg hairs and spines are brown. The epigyne is covered in long dense hairs and has a deep depression that is plugged with a waxy secretion. It has rather large copulatory openings leading to relatively simple seminary ducts and receptacles.

The spider is similar to the related Langelurillus alboguttatus, but can be distinguished by the male's v-shaped tibial apophysis. As with other spiders in the genus, the design of the epigyne is also distinctive.

== Distribution ==
Almost all, if not all, Langelurillus spiders live in sub-Saharan Africa. Langelurillus furcatus is found in Kenya and Tanzania. The male holotype and female paratype were discovered in 1994 in the Mkomazi National Park in Tanzania. The spider was first identified in Kenya in 2016 near Shimoni, but based on examples found in 1977. It has been found in mountain grassland and forests of Spirostachys trees.
