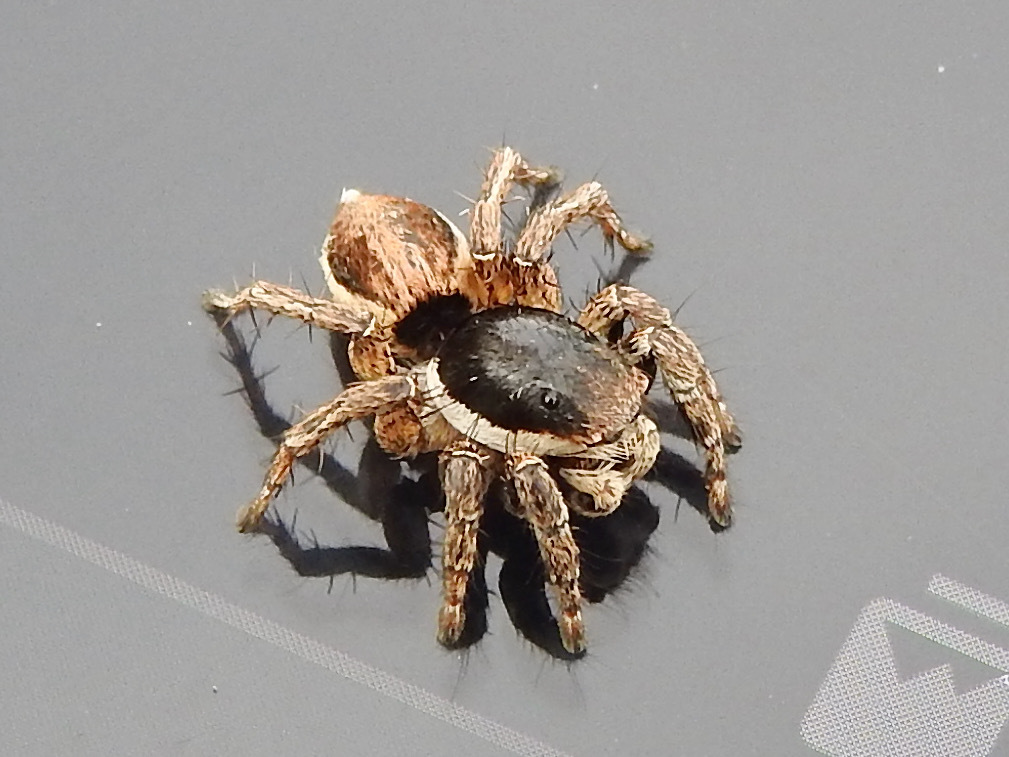
- A spider of the genus Langona

Scientific classification
- Kingdom: Animalia
- Phylum: Arthropoda
- Subphylum: Chelicerata
- Class: Arachnida
- Order: Araneae
- Infraorder: Araneomorphae
- Family: Salticidae
- Genus: Langona
- Species: L. fusca

Binomial name
- Langona fusca Wesołowska, 2011

= Langona fusca =

Species of spider

Langona fusca is a species of jumping spider in the genus Langona that lives in Zimbabwe. It was first described in 2011 by Wanda Wesołowska, one of over 500 that she has detailed. The spider is large, measuring 10 mm (0.39 in) in total length. Only the female has been identified. It has the toothless chelicerae typical of the genus. The epigyne, with its horse-shoe-shaped depression and looped seminar ducts, can help identify the species. The darker colour, which is referred to in the species name, is another distinguishing feature.

== Taxonomy ==
Langona fusca is a jumping spider that was first described by the Polish arachnologist Wanda Wesołowska in 2011. It was one of over 500 species that she has identified, ensuring that she is one of the most prolific describers of spiders to have ever lived. She placed it in the genus Langona, first described by Eugène Simon in 1901, on the basis of its morphological features common with other species previously described, although she expressed doubt on its exact relationship with the genus. The genus was listed in the subtribe Aelurillina in the tribe Aelurillini by Wayne Maddison in 2015. These were allocated to the clade Saltafresia. In 2017, the genus was grouped with nine other genera of jumping spiders under the name Aelurillines. It is particularly closely related to the genus Aelurillus, after which the group is named. The species is named for its dark colour.

== Description ==
The spider is large and hairy, typically measuring over 10 mm (0.39 in) in total length. The female has a cephalothorax that is typically 5 mm (0.20 in) long and 3.8 mm (0.15 in) wide. The carapace is quite high, pear-shaped and covered in short white hairs. The black eye field is very short and has dense short grey hairs and short rod-like bristles. The carapace is dark brown with a stripe down the middle made of grey hairs. The chelicerae are light brown and toothless. The clypeus is moderately high and brown. The abdomen is typically 6.2 mm (0.24 in) long and 5.1 mm (0.20 in) wide. It is brown and hairy, with a slightly serrated-edged marking on the back. The spinnerets are dark. The legs are brown. The epigyne is small and has a narrow depression shaped like a horse shoe. The seminal ducts are looped and lead to receptacles that are smaller than related species. The male has not been described.

Like other Lagona spiders, the chelicerae are toothless. and there is a single apophysis, or appendage, on the pedipalp tibia, which enables it to be distinguished from other Aelurillinae. The species resembles the related Langona bethae, particularly in the exterior of the epigyne. The receptacles are closer to the rear of the spider. However, the clearest way to distinrguish the species from others in the genus is the large size and dark colour.

== Distribution and habitat ==
Langona fusca is endemic to Zimbabwe. The holotype was found in 1987 in Hwange National Park.
