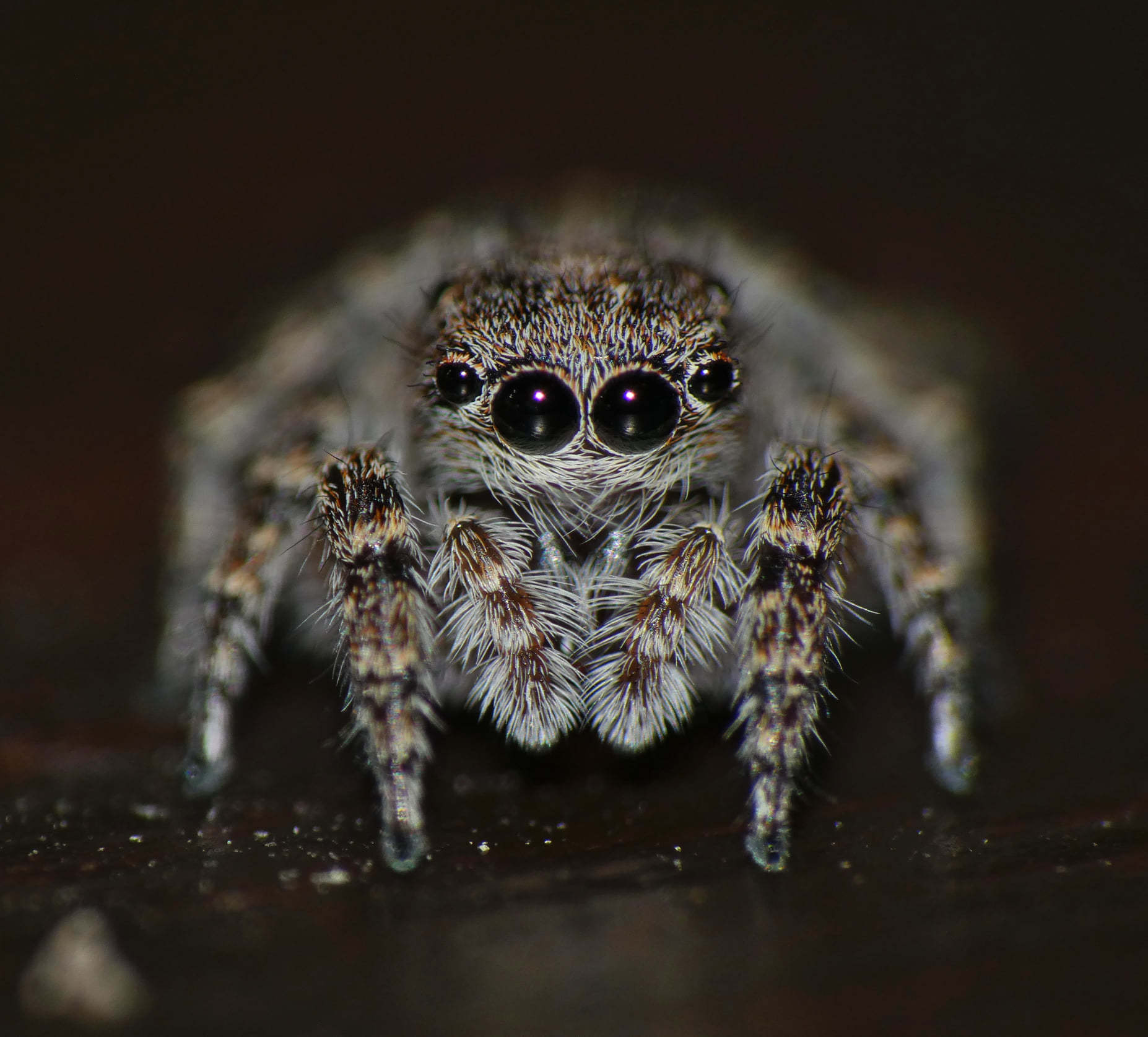
- A spider of the Langelurillus genus

Scientific classification
- Kingdom: Animalia
- Phylum: Arthropoda
- Subphylum: Chelicerata
- Class: Arachnida
- Order: Araneae
- Infraorder: Araneomorphae
- Family: Salticidae
- Genus: Langelurillus
- Species: L. ignorabilis

Binomial name
- Langelurillus ignorabilis Wesołowska & Cumming, 2008

= Langelurillus ignorabilis =

Species of spider

Langelurillus ignorabilis is a species of jumping spider in the genus Langelurillus that lives in Zimbabwe. The female was first described in 2008 by Wanda Wesołowska and Meg Cumming based on an example discovered with ten spiderlings. The male has not been identified. The spider is small with a dark brown carapace 2.7 mm (0.11 in) long and a brownish-grey abdomen 3.0 mm (0.12 in) long. It has short yellow legs. The species is similar to others in its genus and also member of the genus Langona, but differs in the design of the copulatory organs. For example, the seminal ducts are longer and have more loops than Langona bethae.

== Taxonomy ==
Langelurillus ignorabilis is a jumping spider that was first described by Wanda Wesołowska and Meg Cumming in 2008. It was one of over 500 species identified by the Polish arachnologist Wesołowska during her career. They allocated it to the genus Langelurillus, which had been raised by Maciej Próchniewicz in 1994. The genus is related to Aelurillus and Langona but the spiders are smaller and, unlike these genera and Phlegra, they lack the parallel stripes on the back of the body that is feature of the majority of these spiders. In 2015, Wayne Maddison placed the genus in the subtribe Aelurillina, which also contained Aelurillus, Langona and Phlegra, in the tribe Aelurillini, within the subclade Saltafresia in the clade Salticoida. In 2016, Jerzy Prószyński placed the same genera in a group named Aelurillines based on the shape of the spiders' copulatory organs. The species is named after a Latin word that means unknown.

== Description ==
Langelurillus ignorabilis is a small spider. The female has a pear-shaped carapace that typically has a length of 2.7 mm (0.11 in) and a width of 2.2 mm (0.087 in). It is dark brown carapace and covered in dense grey hairs. The clypeus is somewhat high and has a few colourless hairs. The chelicerae are light brown and toothless. The remainder of the mouthparts are generally darker. The abdomen is wider than the carapace, typically 3.0 mm (0.12 in) long and 2.7 mm (0.11 in) wide. It is a brownish-grey oval with an indistinct light streak on the back. The underside is grey. The spinnerets are brownish-grey and the short legs are yellow, with brown hairs and dark spines. The spider has an epigyne with a large central rounded depression and gonopores hidden in shallow furrows. The male has not been described.

The species has similarities to others in the genus, differing particularly in the internal arrangement of the copulatory organs. It is also similar to females of species in the genus Langona. The epigyne is similar to Langona bethae although the seminal ducts are longer and contain more loops. They are also similar to the internal organs in Langona pilosa, but the course of seminal ducts differ slightly.

== Distribution ==
Almost all, if not all, Langelurillus spiders live in sub-Saharan Africa. Langelurillus ignorabilis is endemic to Zimbabwe. The female holotype was discovered in 2004 along with ten spiderlings. It has been found in areas of human habitation.
