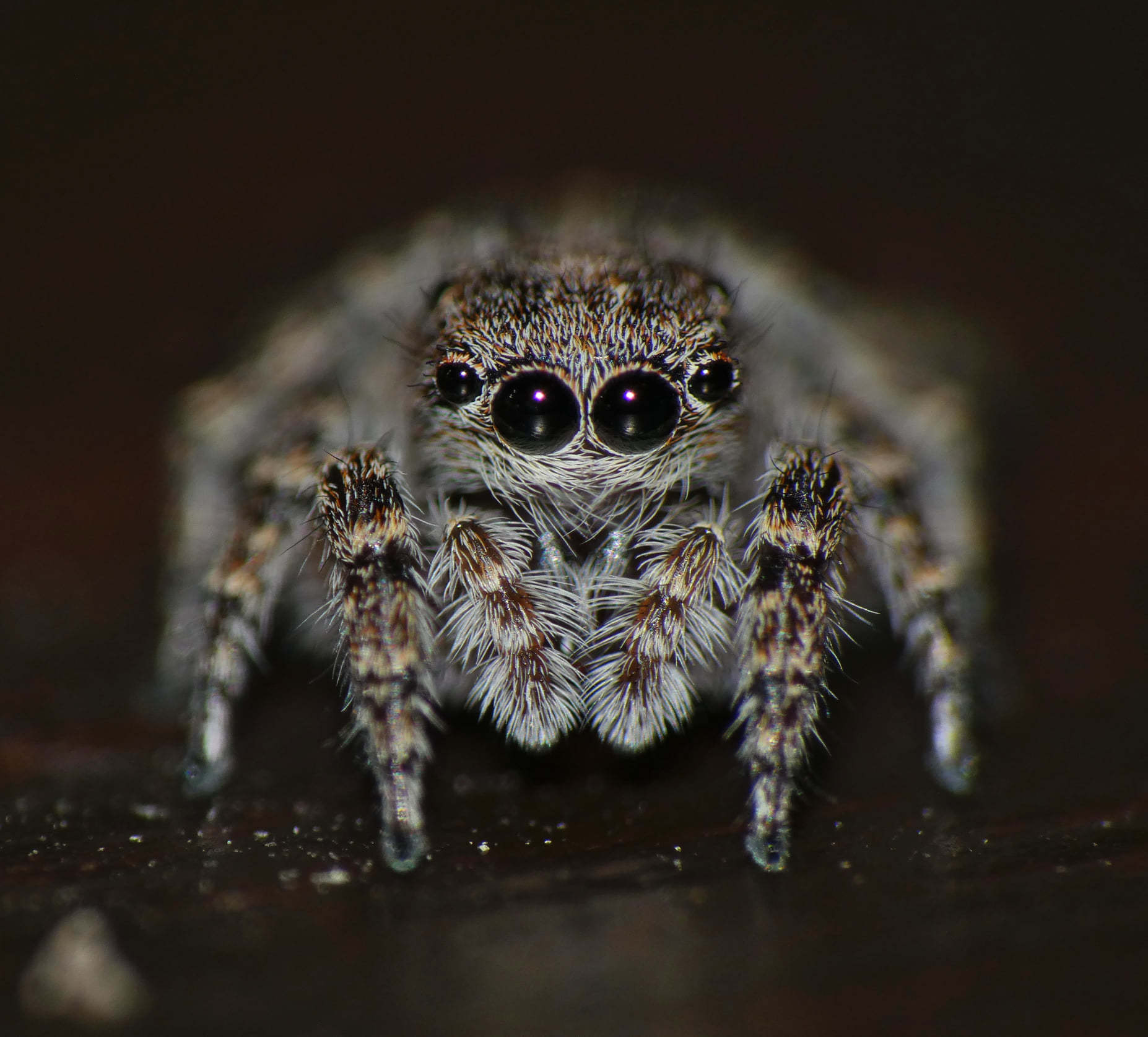

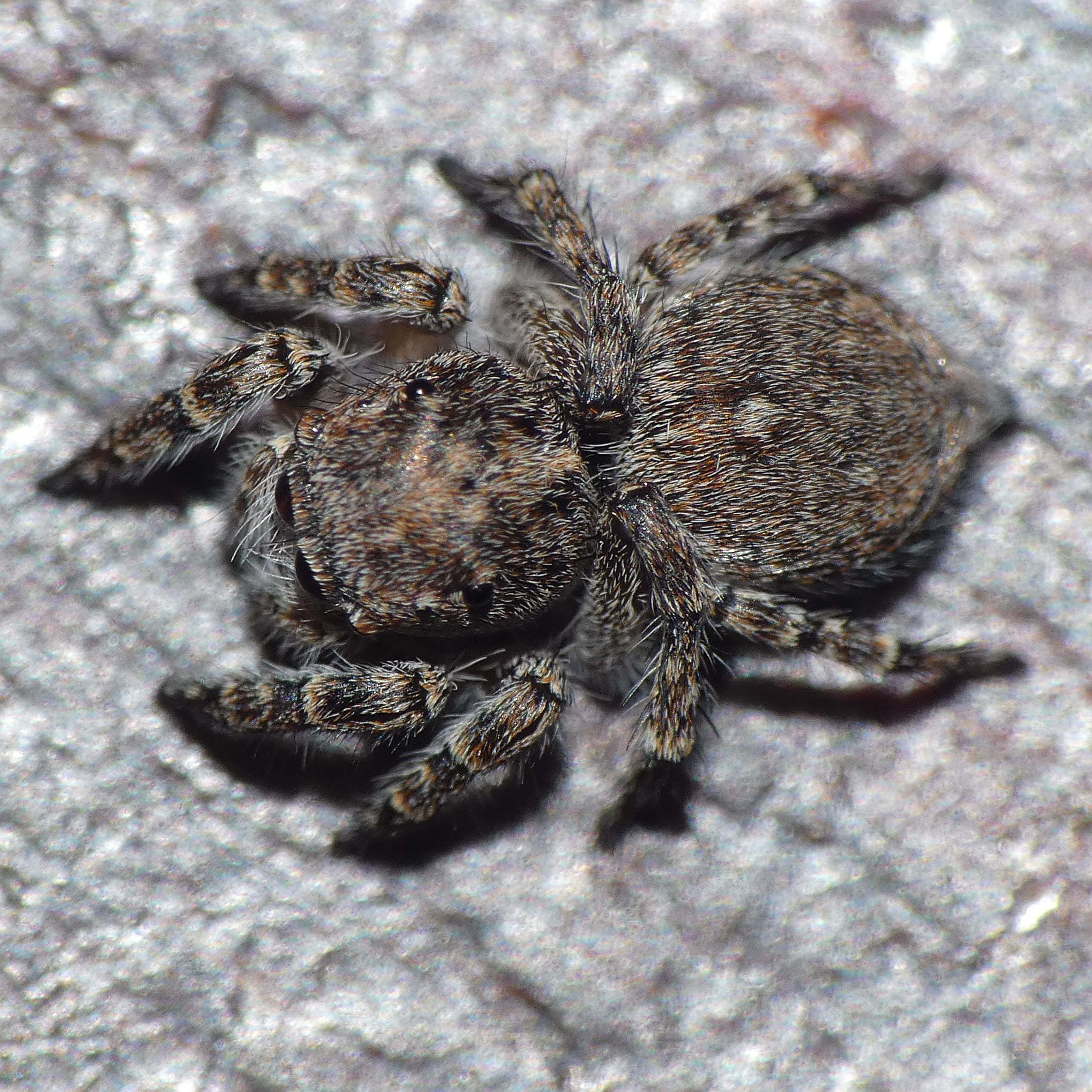
- L. namibicus in Cape Town

Scientific classification
- Kingdom: Animalia
- Phylum: Arthropoda
- Subphylum: Chelicerata
- Class: Arachnida
- Order: Araneae
- Infraorder: Araneomorphae
- Family: Salticidae
- Genus: Langelurillus
- Species: L. namibicus

Binomial name
- Langelurillus namibicus Wesołowska, 2011

= Langelurillus namibicus =

Species of spider

Langelurillus namibicus is a species of jumping spider in the genus Langelurillus that lives in Namibia and South Africa. The female was first described in 2011 by Wanda Wesołowska. The male has not been identified. The spider is small, with an abdomen that is typically 2.7 mm (0.11 in) long and a cephalothorax 2.7 mm (0.11 in) long. It is similar to other related species, particularly Langelurillus cedarbergensis, but can be distinguished by its closely-spaced copulatory openings and three-chambered receptacles.

== Taxonomy ==
Langelurillus namibicus is a jumping spider that was first described by the Polish arachnologist Wanda Wesołowska in 2011. It was one of over 500 species that she identified during her career, making her one of the most prolific amongst all arachnologists. She allocated it to the genus Langelurillus, which had been raised by Maciej Próchniewicz in 1994. However, its exact relationship is unknown as the male has not been described. The genus is related to Aelurillus and Langona but the spiders are generally smaller and, unlike these genera and Phlegra, they lack the parallel stripes on the back of the body that is feature of the majority of these spiders. In 2015, Wayne Maddison placed the genus in the subtribe Aelurillina, which also contained Aelurillus, Langona and Phlegra, in the tribe Aelurillini, within the subclade Saltafresia in the clade Salticoida. In 2016, Jerzy Prószyński placed the same genera in a group named Aelurillines based on the shape of the spiders' copulatory organs.

== Description ==
Langelurillus namibicus is the largest species in the genus. The female has a cephalothorax that has a typical length of 2.7 mm (0.11 in) and width of 2.2 mm (0.087 in). The carapace is dark brown and moderately high with an almost black eye field. The clypeus is low and orange. The chelicerae are light brown with a single tooth visible and the labium is generally brown. The abdomen is typically 3.9 mm (0.15 in) long and 3.4 mm (0.13 in) wide and spherical in shape. It is brownish grey on top and light underneath. The spinnerets are long and yellow. The short legs are brownish-orange and very spiny, with thin brown hairs. The spider has a small epigyne with a wide pocket. The seminal ducts are short and lead to receptables that consist of three highly sclerotized globular chambers. The male has not been described.

It is the design of its copulatory organs that most distinguishes the spider from others in the genus. It most resembles Langelurillus cedarbergensis but differs in that the copulatory openings are closer together, the seminal ducts are longer and there are three receptacle chambers.

== Distribution ==
Almost all, if not all, Langelurillus spiders live in sub-Saharan Africa. Langelurillus namibicus was first found in Namibia, after which the species is named. The first example was collected near Grabwaser in 1986. It has only been found in the south of the country. Subsequently, it was also identified near Kamiesberge in South Africa. The species distribution now includes both countries.
