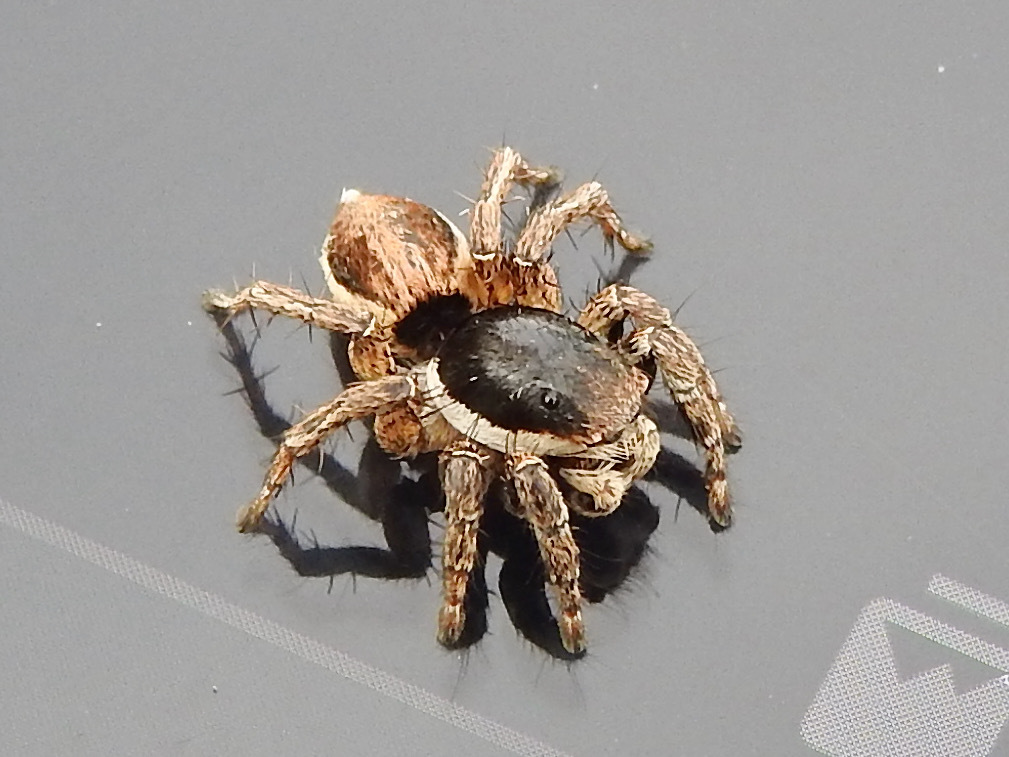
- A spider of the genus Langona

Scientific classification
- Kingdom: Animalia
- Phylum: Arthropoda
- Subphylum: Chelicerata
- Class: Arachnida
- Order: Araneae
- Infraorder: Araneomorphae
- Family: Salticidae
- Genus: Langona
- Species: L. zimbabwensis

Binomial name
- Langona zimbabwensis Wesołowska & Cumming, 2011

= Langona zimbabwensis =

Species of spider

Langona zimbabwensis is a species of jumping spider in the genus Langona that lives in Zimbabwe. The male was first described by Wanda Wesołowska and Meg Cumming in 2011. The female has not been identified. The spider is large with a cephalothorax between 2.9 and 3 mm (0.11 and 0.12 in) long and an abdomen between 2.5 and 2.6 mm (0.098 and 0.102 in). The spider has a brown carapace with two faint white stripes on its back and a black eye field. It has the toothless chelicerae typical of the genus. It has a long and thin tibial apophysis. The spider can be distinguished from others in the genus by its distinctive pattern of 12 white spots, consisting of six pairs, and a black stripe on its abdomen.

== Taxonomy ==
Langona zimbabwensis is a species of jumping spider that was first described by Wanda Wesołowska and Meg Cumming in 2011. The species was placed in the genus Langona, first described by Eugène Simon in 1901. It was listed in the subtribe Aelurillina in the tribe Aelurillini by Wayne Maddison in 2015. These were allocated to the clade Saltafresia. In 2017, the genus was grouped with nine other genera of jumping spiders under the name Aelurillines. It is particularly closely related to the genus Aelurillus, after which the subtribe, tribe and group are named. The species is named for the country where it was first found. The exact taxonomy of the species is uncertain as only the male has been identified.

== Description ==
The spider is large and hairy. The male has a cephalothorax that is between 2.9 and 3 mm (0.11 and 0.12 in) in length and 2 and 2.1 mm (0.079 and 0.083 in) in width. The carapace is long, moderately high and oval. It is brown with a black eye field and covered in light coloured hairs. The thorax has traces of two stripes along its back. The abdomen is a similar shape and grey-beige. It has a pattern of six pairs of white spots with black borders to the front and a black stripe dividing the front from the back. It is between 2.5 and 2.6 mm (0.098 and 0.102 in) long and between 1.7 and 1.8 mm (0.067 and 0.071 in) wide. The top is covered with dense fawn-coloured hairs and the underside is light. The chelicerae are orange and toothless. The spinnerets are black. The legs are brownish-orange and covered with thin brown hairs and long spines. The pedipalps are light. The palpal bulb and cymbium are black, and have long fawn hairs. It has a long, thin appendage, or apophysis, on the tibia of the pedipalp. The female has not been described.

Like other Lagona spiders, the chelicerae are toothless. and there is a single apophysis on the pedipalp tibia, which enables it to be distinguished from other Aelurillinae. The male closely resembles the related Langona vitiosa, but differs in the pattern on the abdomen.

== Distribution and habitat ==
Langona zimbabwensis is endemic to Zimbabwe. The holotype was discovered in the Sengwa Wildlife Research Area in 2002. It has also been found in the Chizarira National Park in 2009.
