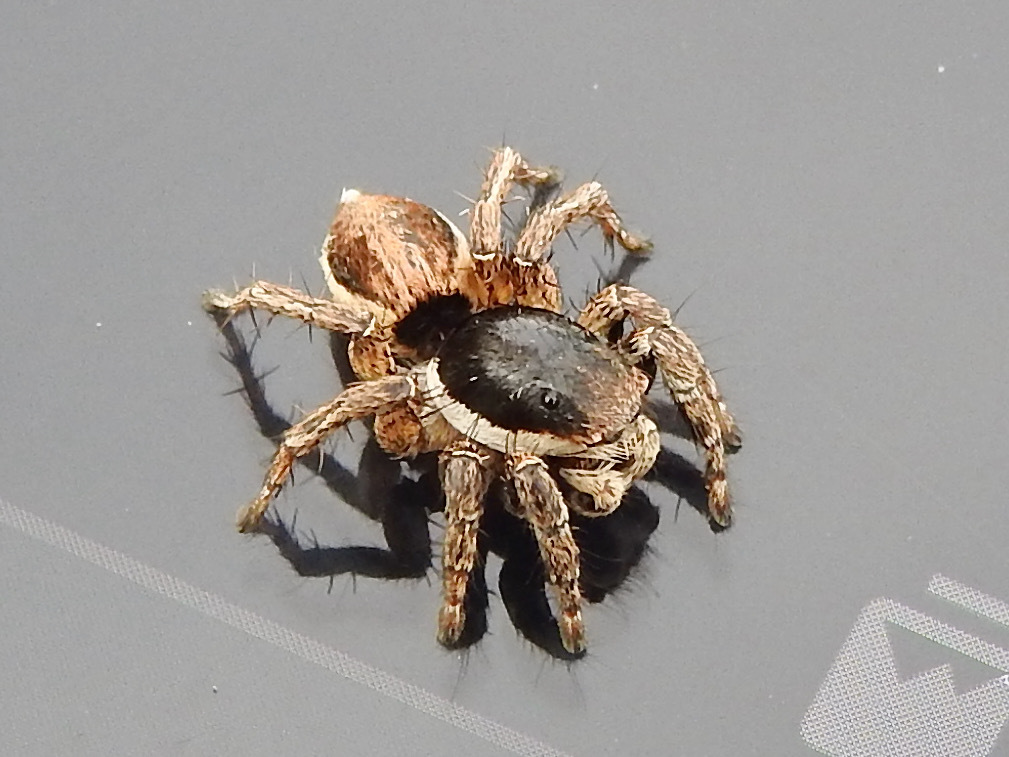
- A spider of the genus Langona

Scientific classification
- Kingdom: Animalia
- Phylum: Arthropoda
- Subphylum: Chelicerata
- Class: Arachnida
- Order: Araneae
- Infraorder: Araneomorphae
- Family: Salticidae
- Genus: Langona
- Species: L. tortuosa

Binomial name
- Langona tortuosa Wesołowska, 2011

= Langona tortuosa =

Species of spider

Langona tortuosa is a species of jumping spider in the genus Langona that lives in Namibia, South Africa and Zimbabwe. It was first described in 2011 by Wanda Wesołowska, based on a holotype from Caprivi. The spider is large with a cephalothorax between 2.4 and 2.8 mm (0.094 and 0.110 in) long and an abdomen between 1.9 and 2.6 mm (0.075 and 0.102 in) long. The female is larger than the male. It has the toothless chelicerae typical of the genus. It can be distinguished by its copulatory organs. The male has a hidden embolus that is shorter than that on the related Langona pilosa. The female has long seminal ducts.

== Taxonomy ==
Langona tortuosa is a jumping spider that was first described by Wanda Wesołowska in 2011. It was one of over 500 species identified by the Polish arachnologist. The species was placed in the genus Langona, first described by Eugène Simon in 1901. It was listed in the subtribe Aelurillina in the tribe Aelurillini by Wayne Maddison in 2015. These were allocated to the clade Saltafresia. In 2017, the genus was grouped with nine other genera of jumping spiders under the name Aelurillines. It is particularly closely related to the genus Aelurillus, after which the group is named. The name of the species is based on a Latin word meaning winding, and relates to the meandering shape of the seminal ducts.

== Description ==
The spider is large and hairy. The male has a cephalothorax that is between 2.4 and 2.5 mm (0.094 and 0.098 in) in length and 1.7 and 1.8 mm (0.067 and 0.071 in) in width. The carapace is quite high, oval, dark brown and hairy. The black eye field has dense grey hairs and short bristled. The abdomen is also a dark brown oval. It is between 1.9 and 2.6 mm (0.075 and 0.102 in) long and between 1.4 and 2 mm (0.055 and 0.079 in) wide. The underside is a lighter brown. The clypeus has light hairs and the spinnerets dark. The chelicerae are toothless. The legs are light brown and hairy. The pedipalps are brown and very hairy. The pedipalp tibia has a single apophysis, or appendage. The cymbium is short with long dense hairs. The palpal bulb has a triangular lobe at the rear. The embolus is hidden between the bulb and cymbium. It is also long and thin.

The female is larger than the male, with a cephalothorax that is typically 2.8 mm (0.11 in) long and 2.3 mm (0.091 in) wide and an abdomen that is 2.6 mm (0.10 in) in length and 2.2 mm (0.087 in) in width. It has similar colours to the male, but there is the hint of stripe down the middle of the abdomen. The epigyne has two narrow depressions. The seminal ducts are long and loop. They become more sclerotized as they go deeper. The receptacles are singular and shaped like a bean.

Like other Lagona spiders, the chelicerae are toothless. and there is a single apophysis, or appendage, on the pedipalp tibia, which enables it to be distinguished from other Aelurillinae. The different Langona species generally cannot be distinguished from each other or from other members of the group by either their colours or the patterns that appear on their bodies, but by the structure of the copulatory organs. The species resembles the related Langona pilosa, but may be identified by the shorter apophysis on the tibia in the male and longer seminal ducts in the female.

== Distribution and habitat ==
Langona tortuosa is found in Namibia, South Africa and Zimbabwe. The holotype was found in 1987 in Caprivi, about 26 kilometres (16 mi) west of Kongola, Namibia. It has been found in Matabeleland in Zimbabwe. It has also been identified in South Africa. The first instance to be recorded was in 2009 in the Kruger National Park. The spider is ground-dwelling spider and lives in savanna.
