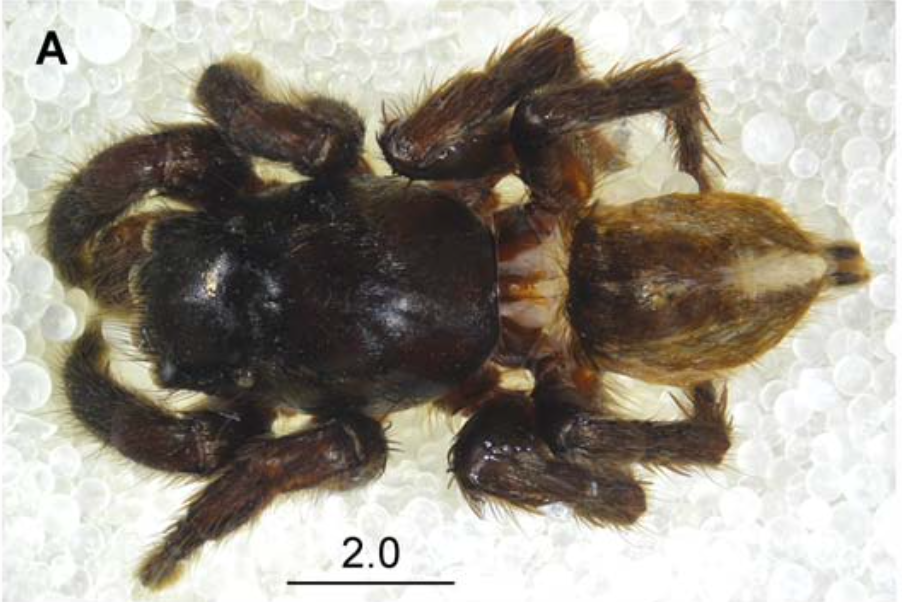
- Adult female

Scientific classification
- Kingdom: Animalia
- Phylum: Arthropoda
- Subphylum: Chelicerata
- Class: Arachnida
- Order: Araneae
- Infraorder: Araneomorphae
- Family: Salticidae
- Genus: Langona
- Species: L. recta

Binomial name
- Langona recta Wesołowska & Russell-Smith, 2022

= Langona recta =

Species of spider

Langona recta is a species of jumping spider in the genus Langona that lives in Ivory Coast. It was first described in 2022 by Wanda Wesołowska and Anthony Russell-Smith. Only the male has been identified. The spider is medium-sized, with a cephalothorax that is typically 4.0 mm (0.16 in) long and an abdomen between 3.0 and 3.5 mm (0.12 and 0.14 in) long. It is hairy and brown, the abdomen lighter than the carapace with a hint of a white streak visible on the back. It has the toothless chelicerae typical of the genus, but, unlike other Langona spiders, has a straight palpal apophysis, or spike, reflected in the species name.

== Taxonomy ==
Langona recta was first described by the arachnologists Wanda Wesołowska and Anthony Russell-Smith in 2022. It was one of over 500 species that Wesołowska has identified, ensuring that she is one of the most prolific describers of jumping spiders to have ever lived. They placed it in the genus Langona, first described by Eugène Simon in 1901 The genus was listed in the subtribe Aelurillina in the tribe Aelurillini by Wayne Maddison in 2015. These were allocated to the clade Saltafresia. In 2017, the genus was grouped with nine other genera of jumping spiders under the name Aelurillines. It is particularly closely related to the genus Aelurillus, after which the group is named. The species is named for the Latin word for straight.

== Description ==
The spider is medium-sized and hairy. The male has a cephalothorax that is typically 4.0 mm (0.16 in) long and 2.7 mm (0.11 in) wide. The carapace is brown, shiny and has a dense covering of delicate hairs. The black eye field is short, typically 1.2 mm (0.047 in) long. The chelicerae has short fangs and two very small teeth to the front. The abdomen is between 3.0 and 3.5 mm (0.12 and 0.14 in) long and between 2.1 and 2.3 mm (0.083 and 0.091 in) wide. It is lighter in colour than the carapace and hairy, with the vague suggestion of a white marking on the back. The rear two thirds are covered by a sclerotized scutum. The spider has black hairy legs and dark spinnerets. It has black pedipalps with a white cymbium. The embolus is hidden between the palpal bulb and cymbium, and the palpal apophysis, or spike, is straight, which is reflected in the species name. The female has not been described.

Like other Lagona spiders, the chelicerae are toothless. and there is a single apophysis, or appendage, on the pedipalp tibia, which enables it to be distinguished from other Aelurillinae. The straight palpal apophysis enables it to be identified from other members of the genus.

== Distribution and habitat ==
Langona recta is endemic to Ivory Coast. The holotype was found in 1975 in Lamto Scientific Reserve.
