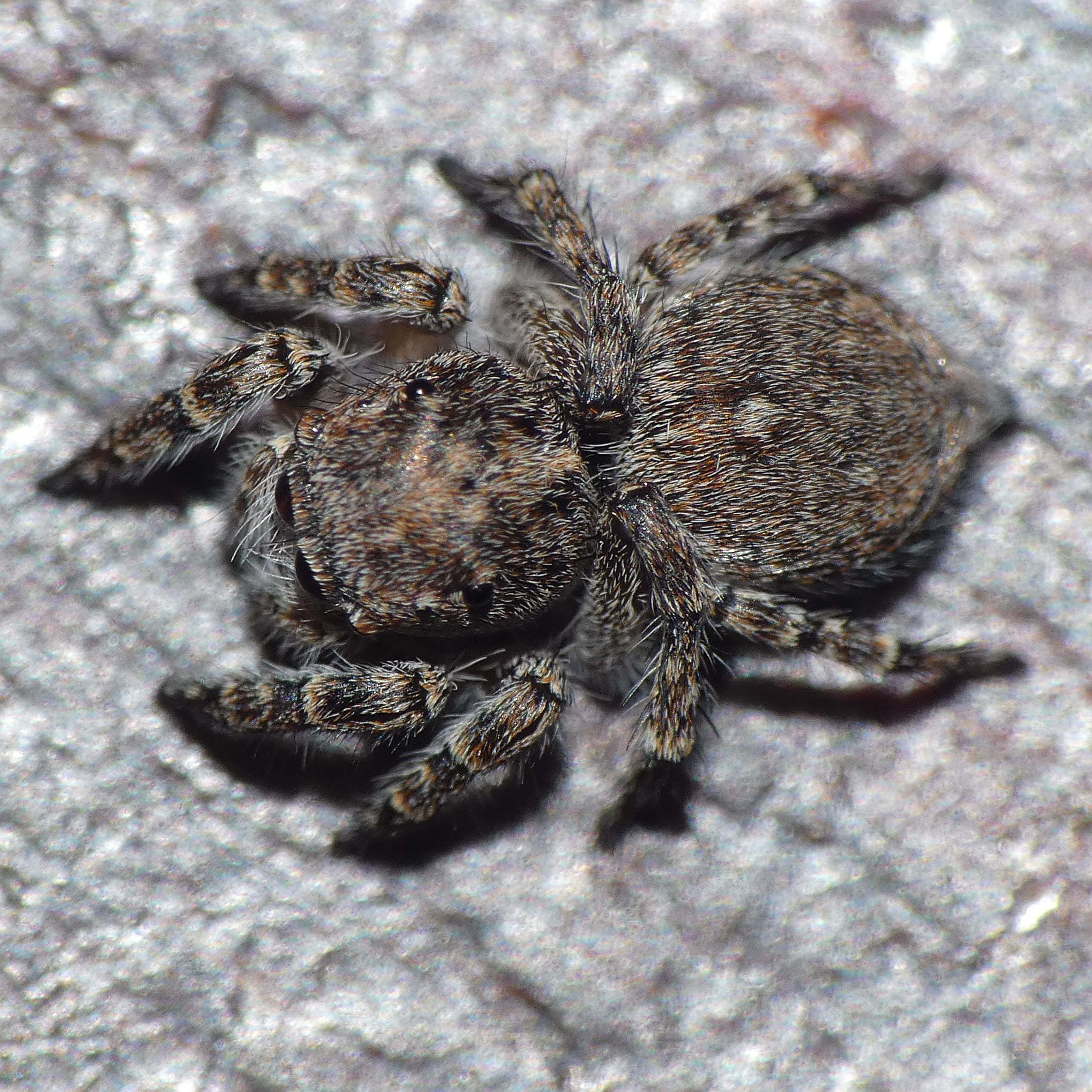
- A spider of the Langelurillus genus

Scientific classification
- Kingdom: Animalia
- Phylum: Arthropoda
- Subphylum: Chelicerata
- Class: Arachnida
- Order: Araneae
- Infraorder: Araneomorphae
- Family: Salticidae
- Genus: Langelurillus
- Species: L. cedarbergensis

Binomial name
- Langelurillus cedarbergensis Haddad & Wesołowska, 2013

= Langelurillus cedarbergensis =

Species of spider

Langelurillus cedarbergensis is a species of jumping spider in the genus Langelurillus that lives in South Africa. It was first described in 2013 by Charles Haddad and Wanda Wesołowska. Only the female has been found. The spider lives in fynbos around the Cederberg Mountains, after which the species is named. It is a small spider, with a cephalothorax between 2.6 and 2.7 mm (0.10 and 0.11 in) long and an abdomen between 3.4 and 3.8 mm (0.13 and 0.15 in) long. It is similar to other related species, particularly Langelurillus namibicus, but can be distinguished by its widely-spaced copulatory openings and short seminal ducts.

== Taxonomy ==
Langelurillus cedarbergensis is a jumping spider that was first described by Charles Haddad and Wanda Wesołowska in 2013. It was one of over 500 species identified by the Polish arachnologist during her career. It was allocated it to the genus Langelurillus, which had been raised by Maciej Próchniewicz in 1994. The genus is related to Aelurillus and Langona but the spiders are smaller and, unlike these genera and Phlegra, they lack the parallel stripes on the back of the body that is feature of the majority of these spiders. In 2015, Wayne Maddison listed the genus in the subtribe Aelurillina, which also contained Aelurillus, Langona and Phlegra, in the tribe Aelurillini, within the subclade Saltafresia in the clade Salticoida. In 2016, Jerzy Prószyński placed the same genera in a group named Aelurillines based on the shape of the spiders' copulatory organs. The species is named after the area where it was first discovered.

== Description ==
Langelurillus cedarbergensis is a small spider. The female has a cephalothorax that ranges in size between 2.6 and 2.7 mm (0.10 and 0.11 in) in length and 2.0 and 2.2 mm (0.079 and 0.087 in) in width. It has a carapace that Is high, dark brown and covered in dense grey-white hairs. It has a black eye field. The clypeus is low and orange. The chelicerae are light brown with a small visible tooth on the edge. The labium is brownish with pale tips. The abdomen is spherical, between 3.4 and 3.8 mm (0.13 and 0.15 in) long and typically 3.2 mm (0.13 in) wide. It is greyish beige on top with a light underside and has long spinnerets. The spider has short light brown legs. The epigyne is small with a notch to the rear and a wide pocket. The copulatory openings are also to the back of the epigyne leading to short seminal ducts. The spermathecae have a single chamber. The male has not been described.

It is the design of its copulatory organs that most distinguishes the spider from others in the genus. It most resembles Langelurillus namibicus but differs in that the copulatory openings are wide apart and the seminal ducts short.

== Distribution ==
Almost all, if not all, Langelurillus spiders are to be found in sub-Saharan Africa. Langelurillus cedarbergensis is endemic to South Africa. The holotype was discovered in 1985 in the Cedarberg Mountains, after which the species is named. It is a ground-dwelling spider that lives in fynbos environments.
