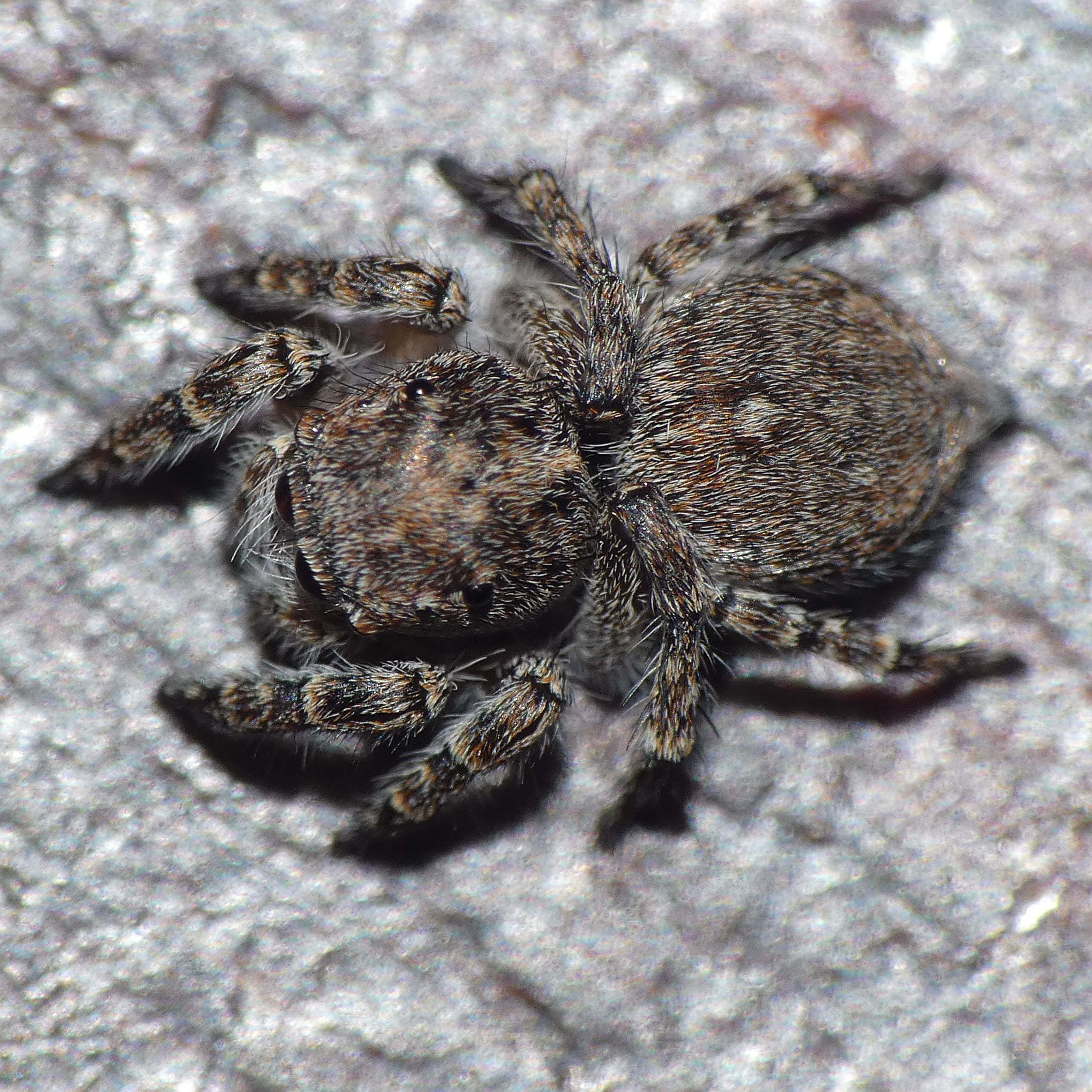
- A spider of the Langelurillus genus

Scientific classification
- Kingdom: Animalia
- Phylum: Arthropoda
- Subphylum: Chelicerata
- Class: Arachnida
- Order: Araneae
- Infraorder: Araneomorphae
- Family: Salticidae
- Genus: Langelurillus
- Species: L. alboguttatus

Binomial name
- Langelurillus alboguttatus Wesołowska & Russell-Smith, 2000

= Langelurillus alboguttatus =

Species of spider

Langelurillus alboguttatus is a species of jumping spider in the genus Langelurillus that lives in Tanzania. It was first described in 2000 by Wanda Wesołowska and Anthony Russell-Smith. Only the male has been identified. The spider is small, with a carapace typically 1.7 mm (0.067 in) long and an abdomen 1.4 mm (0.055 in) long. The dark brown carapace is plain and the yellow abdomen has a single fawn stripe, while the legs are short and yellowish-orange. It is similar to other related species, particularly Langelurillus furcatus, but can be distinguished by the presence of the three tibial apophysis, or spikes, on the pedipalp.

== Taxonomy ==
Langelurillus alboguttatus is a jumping spider that was first described by Wanda Wesołowska and Anthony Russell-Smith in 2000. It was one of over 500 species identified by the Polish arachnologist during her career. They allocated it to the genus Langelurillus, which had been raised by Maciej Próchniewicz in 1994. The genus is related to Aelurillus and Langona but the spiders are smaller and, unlike these genera and Phlegra, they lack the parallel stripes on the back of the body that is feature of the majority of these spiders. In 2015, Wayne Maddison listed the genus in the subtribe Aelurillina, which also contained Aelurillus, Langona and Phlegra, in the tribe Aelurillini, within the subclade Saltafresia in the clade Salticoida. In 2016, Jerzy Prószyński placed the same genera in a group named Aelurillines based on the shape of the spiders' copulatory organs. The species is named after two Latin words that mean whitish spotted.

== Description ==
Langelurillus alboguttatus is a small spider. The male has a rather high, dark brown carapace that is typically 1.7 mm (0.067 in) long and 1.6 mm (0.063 in) wide. It has an eye field that is darker and marked with a wide streak down the middle. The clypeus is low and light brown. The chelicerae are light brown and hairy with no visible teeth. The labium is yellowish. The abdomen is similar in size to the carapace, typically 1.4 mm (0.055 in) long and 1.0 mm (0.039 in) wide. It is yellow on the top, covered in long brown hairs, with a wide fawn stripe, and yellowish-grey on the underside. The spinnerets are yellowish. The legs are generally short, have a yellowish-orange hue and have brown spines. The pedipalps are light brown, with three tibial apophysis, or spikes. It is the presence of these three tibial apophysis that most distinguishes the species from the closely related Langelurillus furcatus. The coiled embolus is hidden behind a shield. The female has not been described.

== Distribution and habitat ==
Almost all, if not all, Langelurillus spiders are to be found in sub-Saharan Africa. Langelurillus alboguttatus is endemic to Tanzania. The holotype was discovered in 1995 in the Mkomazi National Park It has been found in bushland areas of Acacia and Commiphora. It has only been identified in that reserve.
