= Langona minima =

Scientific classification
- Kingdom: Animalia
- Phylum: Arthropoda
- Subphylum: Chelicerata
- Class: Arachnida
- Order: Araneae
- Infraorder: Araneomorphae
- Family: Salticidae
- Genus: Langona
- Species: L. minima

Binomial name
- Langona minima Caporiacco, 1949

Species of jumping spider

Langona minima is a species of jumping spider that lives in Kenya. A member of the genus Langona, the spider was first described by Ludovico di Caporiacco in 1949. The female is typically 3.2 mm (0.13 in) long and generally brownish-black, although the underside of its abdomen is lighter and there are reddish-brown tips at the end of its maxillae, part of its mouthparts. The species can be distinguished from other similar spiders by its copulatory organs, and particularly the triangular plate on its epigyne, the visible external part of the female's copulatory organs. The male has not been described. The species may be a nomen dubium as its syntype may be lost.

== Taxonomy ==
Langona minima is a species of jumping spider, a member of the family Salticidae, that was first described by the arachnologist Ludovico di Caporiacco in 1949. He placed the species in the genus Langona, which was first circumscribed by the French naturalist Eugène Simon in 1901. The genus was listed in the subtribe Aelurillina in the tribe Aelurillini by the Canadian biologist Wayne Maddison in 2015. These were allocated to the clade Saltafresia. In 2017, the Polish arachnologist Jerzy Prószyński grouped the genus with nine other genera of jumping spiders under the name Aelurillines. It is particularly closely related to the genus Aelurillus, after which the subtribe, tribe and group are named.

The syntype for the species is reported as being stored in the Museo Civico di Storia Naturale in Verona, Italy. In 2025, Danniella Sherwood, Theo Blick and Francesco Ballarin proposed that the species be made a nomen dubium as they could not find the syntype and found the description published by Caporiacco, including the diagram of the spider's copulatory organs, was insufficient to confirm that the species as being distinct. The World Spider Catalog continued to accept the species as valid.

== Description ==
The spider is small with a typical body length of 3.2 mm (0.13 in). The female has a brownish-black front section, or cephalothorax, that is about 1.82 mm (0.072 in) long. The part of the underside of its cephalothorax known as its sternum is brown. It has a black-brown face, or clypeus, and an indistinct spot on either side of its carapace, the hard upper surface of its cephalothorax, behind its eyes. Its mouth parts, including its chelicerae, are brownish-black but its maxillae have red-brown tips.

The spider's abdomen, found behind its cephalothorax, is also generally brown, about 1.4 mm (0.055 in) long and has an oval rear. Its underside is lighter than its topside. Its legs are generally brown with long brown spines. The spider has a yellow pedipalp. The structure of its copulatory organs distinguishes it from other Langona species. Its epigyne, the visible external part of the female's copulatory organs, has a central triangular plate. The male has not been described.

== Distribution ==
Langona minima is endemic to Kenya. The spider was first identified near Nairobi in 1944. It has only been found in this locality.
