= Langona pallida =

Scientific classification
- Kingdom: Animalia
- Phylum: Arthropoda
- Subphylum: Chelicerata
- Class: Arachnida
- Order: Araneae
- Infraorder: Araneomorphae
- Family: Salticidae
- Genus: Langona
- Species: L. pallida

Binomial name
- Langona pallida Prószyński, 1993

Species of jumping spider

Langona pallida is a species of jumping spider in the genus Langona that lives in Afghanistan, Iran, Saudi Arabia, and United Arab Emirates.
