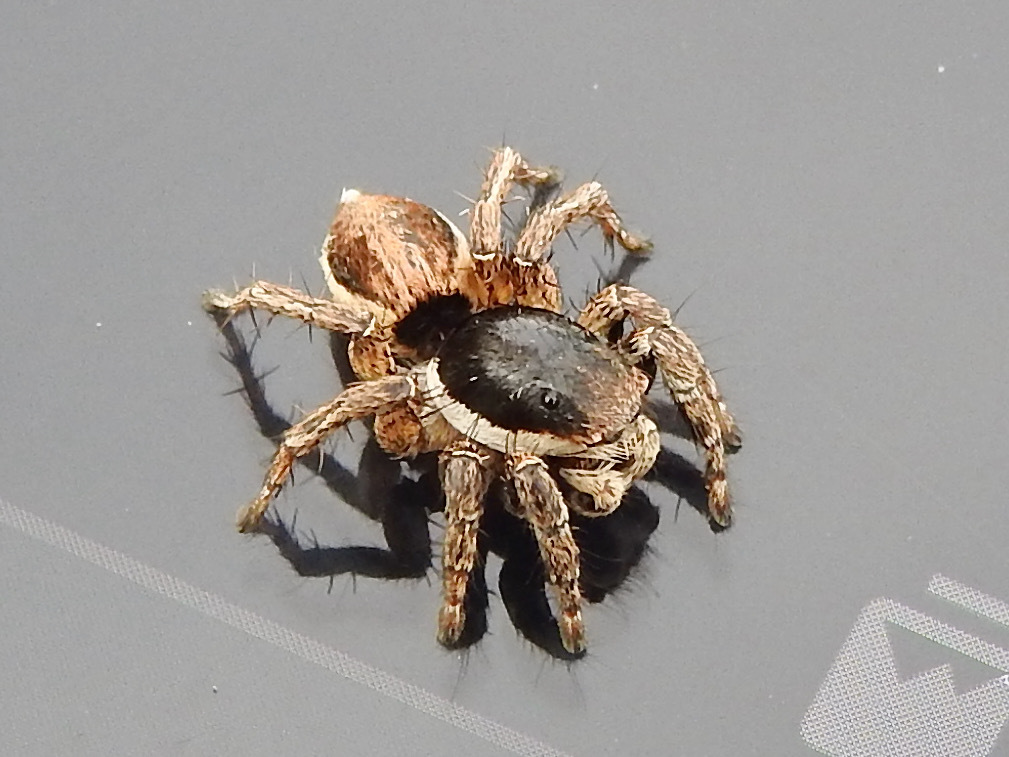
- A spider of the genus Langona

Scientific classification
- Kingdom: Animalia
- Phylum: Arthropoda
- Subphylum: Chelicerata
- Class: Arachnida
- Order: Araneae
- Infraorder: Araneomorphae
- Family: Salticidae
- Genus: Langona
- Species: L. improcera

Binomial name
- Langona improcera Wesołowska & Russell-Smith, 2000

= Langona improcera =

Species of spider

Langona improcera is a species of jumping spider in the genus Langona that lives in Tanzania. The male was first described by Wanda Wesołowska and Anthony Russell-Smith in 2000. The female has not been identified. The spider is large with a carapace between 2.2 and 2.4 mm (0.087 and 0.094 in) long and an abdomen that is between 2.1 and 2.3 mm (0.083 and 0.091 in) in length. There are traces of stripes on the reddish-brown carapace. The abdomen has a distinctive scutum that distinguishes it from related species. The palpal bulb is also unusually narrow and has a long lobe at the base which can also be used to tell the spider apart from others in the genus.

== Taxonomy ==
Langona improcera is a jumping spider that was first described by Wanda Wesołowska and Anthony Russell-Smith in 2000. The species was placed in the genus Langona, first described by Eugène Simon in 1901. The species is one of over 500 described by Wesołowska during her career. The genus was listed in the subtribe Aelurillina in the tribe Aelurillini by Wayne Maddison in 2015. These were allocated to the clade Saltafresia. In 2017, the genus was grouped with nine other genera of jumping spiders under the name Aelurillines. It is particularly closely related to the genus Aelurillus, after which the subtribe, tribe and group are named. The species name is related to the Latin word for modest.

== Description ==
The spider is large and hairy. The male has a pear-shaped carapace that is between 2.2 and 2.4 mm (0.087 and 0.094 in) in length and 2 and 2.1 mm (0.079 and 0.083 in) in width. It is reddish-brown with a black eye field and has traces of stripes along its back. The abdomen is yellow and between 2.1 and 2.3 mm (0.083 and 0.091 in) long and between 1.8 and 2 mm (0.071 and 0.079 in) wide. It has a distinctive scutum on its back. The chelicerae is toothless apart from two small teeth on the edge of front. The spinnerets are long and beige. The legs are yellow and have brown hairs and spines. The pedipalps are orange with hairy cymbium. The palpal bulb is comparatively narrow with a long lobe at the base and a bump in the femur. There is a single appendage, or apophysis, on the tibia of the pedipalps. The female has not been described.

The spider can be distinguished from other members of the genus by the scutum on its abdomen. It differs from Langona warchalowskii in the narrowness of the palpal bulb and the size of the lobe at its base.

== Distribution and habitat ==
Langona improcera is endemic to Tanzania. The holotype was discovered in the 1997 in the Mkomazi National Park, living in shrub dominated by Senegalia mellifera.
