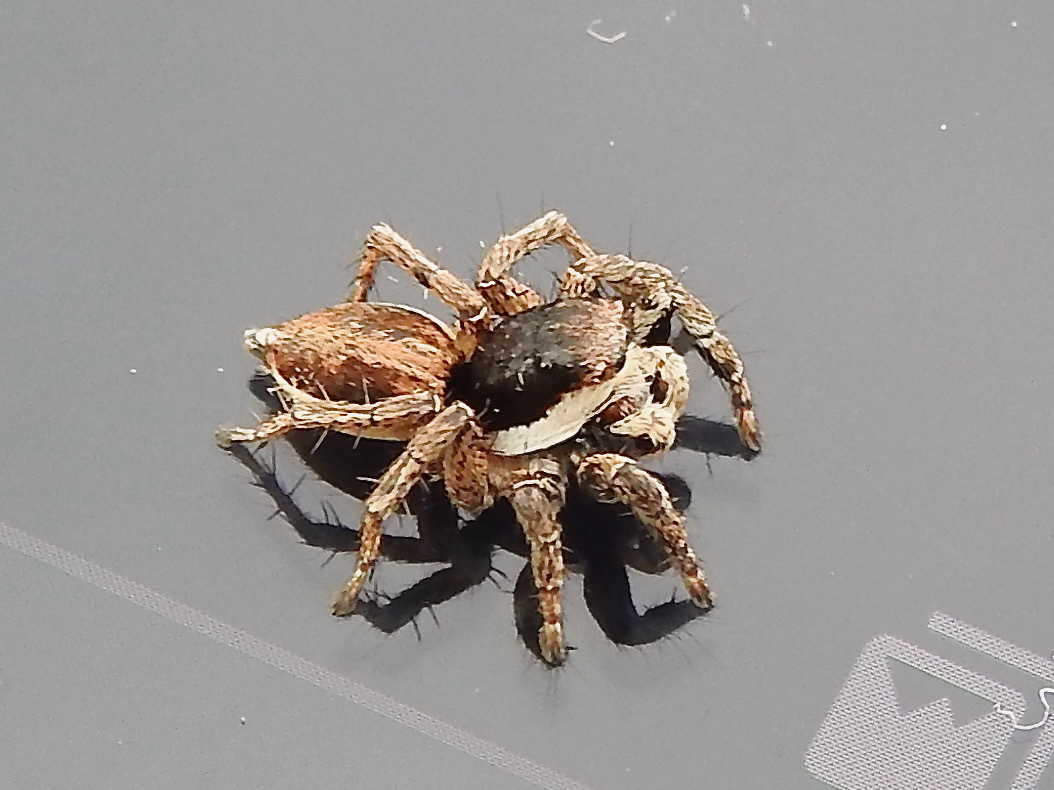
- A spider of the genus Langona

Scientific classification
- Kingdom: Animalia
- Phylum: Arthropoda
- Subphylum: Chelicerata
- Class: Arachnida
- Order: Araneae
- Infraorder: Araneomorphae
- Family: Salticidae
- Genus: Langona
- Species: L. manicata

Binomial name
- Langona manicata Simon, 1901

= Langona manicata =

Species of spider

Langona manicata is a species of jumping spider in the genus Langona that lives in South Africa. The spider was first described by Eugène Simon in 1901. It is large, between 6 and 38 mm (0.24 and 1.50 in) long, the female larger than the male. The female has a white-grey cephalothorax with a stripe down the middle while the male has a black cephalothorax. The female also has a stripe of its abdomen, which the male lacks. It is hard to differentiate from other Langona spiders, particularly Langona avara. The main distinguishing characteristic is the colour of the hairs on the single apophysis on the male pedipalp.

== Taxonomy ==
Langona manicata is a jumping spider first described by Eugène Simon in 1901. He placed the species in the genus Langona, which he also first described at the same time. The genus was listed in the subtribe Aelurillina in the tribe Aelurillini by Wayne Maddison in 2015. These were allocated to the clade Saltafresia. In 2017, the genus was grouped with nine other genera of jumping spiders under the name Aelurillines. It is particularly closely related to the genus Aelurillus, after which the subtribe, tribe and group are named. The different Langona species generally cannot be distinguished from each other or from other members of the group by either their colours or the patterns that appear on their bodies, but by the structure of the copulatory organs.

== Description ==
The spider is large and hairy. The male measures about 6 mm (0.24 in) long. It has a black cephalothorax that is covered with black, red and yellow hairs. The eye field is large and the uppermost eyes are fringed with red hairs. The abdomen is short and also black, with a white line down the middle that has whitish-red hairs. The underside is yellow-white. Whitish-red hairs can also be found on the short legs. The tibial apophysis, or appendage, has a curved tip. Like other Lagona spiders, the chelicerae are toothless and there is a single apophysis on the pedipalp tibia, which enables it to be distinguished from other Aelurillinae.

The female is larger than the male, typically 8 mm (0.31 in) long. It has a white-grey cephalothorax than is marked with a wide band down the middle and black edges. The abdomen similarly has a stripe, although it is greyish-red and thinner. The species is very similar to Langona avara, but differs in the colours of the hairs on the male pedipalp.

== Distribution ==
Langona manicata is endemic to South Africa. The holotype was found in Makapan near Mokopane.
