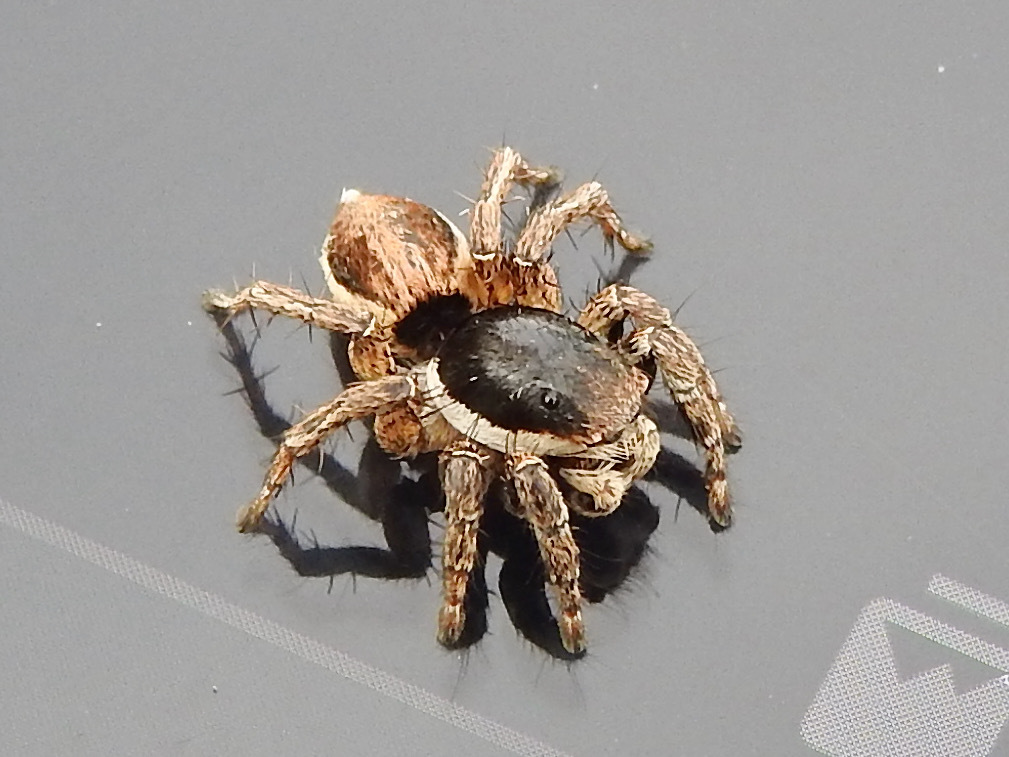
- A spider of the genus Langona

Scientific classification
- Kingdom: Animalia
- Phylum: Arthropoda
- Subphylum: Chelicerata
- Class: Arachnida
- Order: Araneae
- Infraorder: Araneomorphae
- Family: Salticidae
- Genus: Langona
- Species: L. lotzi

Binomial name
- Langona lotzi Haddad & Wesołowska, 2011

= Langona lotzi =

Species of spider

Langona lotzi is a species of jumping spider in the genus Langona that lives in Lesotho and South Africa. It was first described in 2011 by Charles Haddad and Wanda Wesołowska. The spider is large with a carapace that is between 2.1 and 2.8 mm (0.083 and 0.110 in) long and an abdomen between 2 and 2.9 mm (0.079 and 0.114 in) long. The female is larger than the male. The carapace is dark brown with a black eye field. The male abdomen is black brown with three white stripes, while the female has a plain greyish-brown abdomen. As the colouring is similar to other spiders in the genus, the species is best distinguished by its copulatory organs. The male has an unusually small embolus that has its base hidden in the palpal bulb cymbium. The female has a unique epigyne with a shallow depression lined with sclerotised wings covering the gonopores and a simple internal morphology.

== Taxonomy ==
Langona lotzi is a jumping spider that was first described by Wanda Wesołowska and Charles Haddad in 2011. It was one of over 500 species identified by the Polish arachnologist Wesołowska. They placed the species in the genus Langona, first described by Eugène Simon in 1901. It was listed in the subtribe Aelurillina in the tribe Aelurillini by Wayne Maddison in 2015. These were allocated to the clade Saltafresia. In 2017, the genus was grouped with nine other genera of jumping spiders under the name Aelurillines. It is particularly closely related to the genus Aelurillus, after which the group is named. The species is named after Leon Lotz, curator of the National Museum, Bloemfontein, and the person who the collected the first example of the species.

== Description ==
Langona lotzi is medium-sized and hairy. The male has a carapace that is between 2.1 and 2.3 mm (0.083 and 0.091 in) in length and 1.5 and 1.6 mm (0.059 and 0.063 in) in width. The carapace is quite high, oval, dark brown and hairy. The eye field is short and covers about a third of the carapace. It is black, and has a covering in long brown bristles. There are two thin stripes the mark the carapace made of white hairs. The abdomen is between 2 and 2.1 mm (0.079 and 0.083 in) long and between 1.4 and 1.5 mm (0.055 and 0.059 in) wide. It is black brown with three white stripes. The clypeus and spinnerets are dark. The chelicerae is unidentate with the teeth almost invisible. The legs are light brown and have dark hairs. The pedipalps are brownish on top and black underneath, with white hairs on the cymbium and tibia. The tibia has a single hooked apophysis, or appendage. The embolus is short and has a base that is hidden in a pocket in the cymbium.

The female is larger than the male, with a carapace that is between 2.3 and 2.8 mm (0.091 and 0.110 in) long and between 1.6 and 1.8 mm (0.063 and 0.071 in) wide while the abdomen is between 2.5 and 2.9 mm (0.098 and 0.114 in) in length and between 1.9 and 2.3 mm (0.075 and 0.091 in) in width The colouring is similar, but the carapace is lighter and the markings are less pronounced. The abdomen is greyish-brown and has no stripes. The epigyne has a shallow depression, which has highly sclerotised wing-like edges that cover the gonopores. The internal structure is relatively simple compared to related species, with the receptacles having only a small number of chambers.

Like other Lagona spiders, there is a single appendage on the pedipalp tibia, which enables it to be distinguished from other Aelurillinae. However, it differs in that otherwise the spiders have a toothless chelicerae. The different Langona species generally cannot be distinguished from each other or from other members of the group by either their colours or the patterns that appear on their bodies, but by the structure of the copulatory organs. The male has a shorter embolus than other species and lacks the setae that often surround the tibia. The female has a unique epigyne that has less sclerotisation than others and a less complex internal design.

== Distribution and habitat ==
Langona lotzi lives in Lesotho and South Africa. It was initially only been found in the Eastern part of the Free State, South Africa. The holotype was found in Golden Gate Highlands National Park in 1985. In 2003, it was found near Mohale Dam, which extended its range to include Lesotho. The spider lives in Montane grasslands and shrublands at high altitudes.
