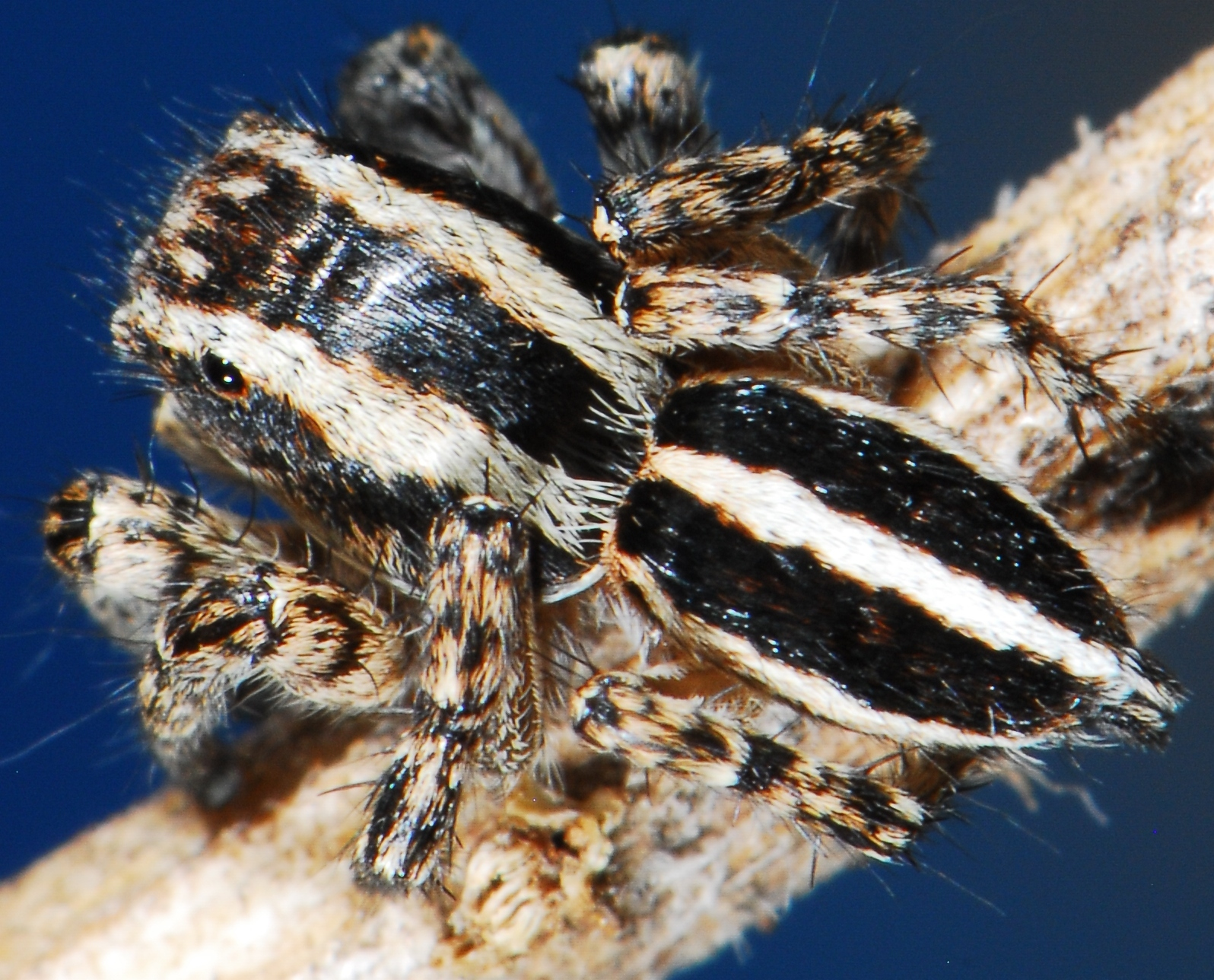
- A female adult from the Tswalu Kalahari Reserve in South Africa
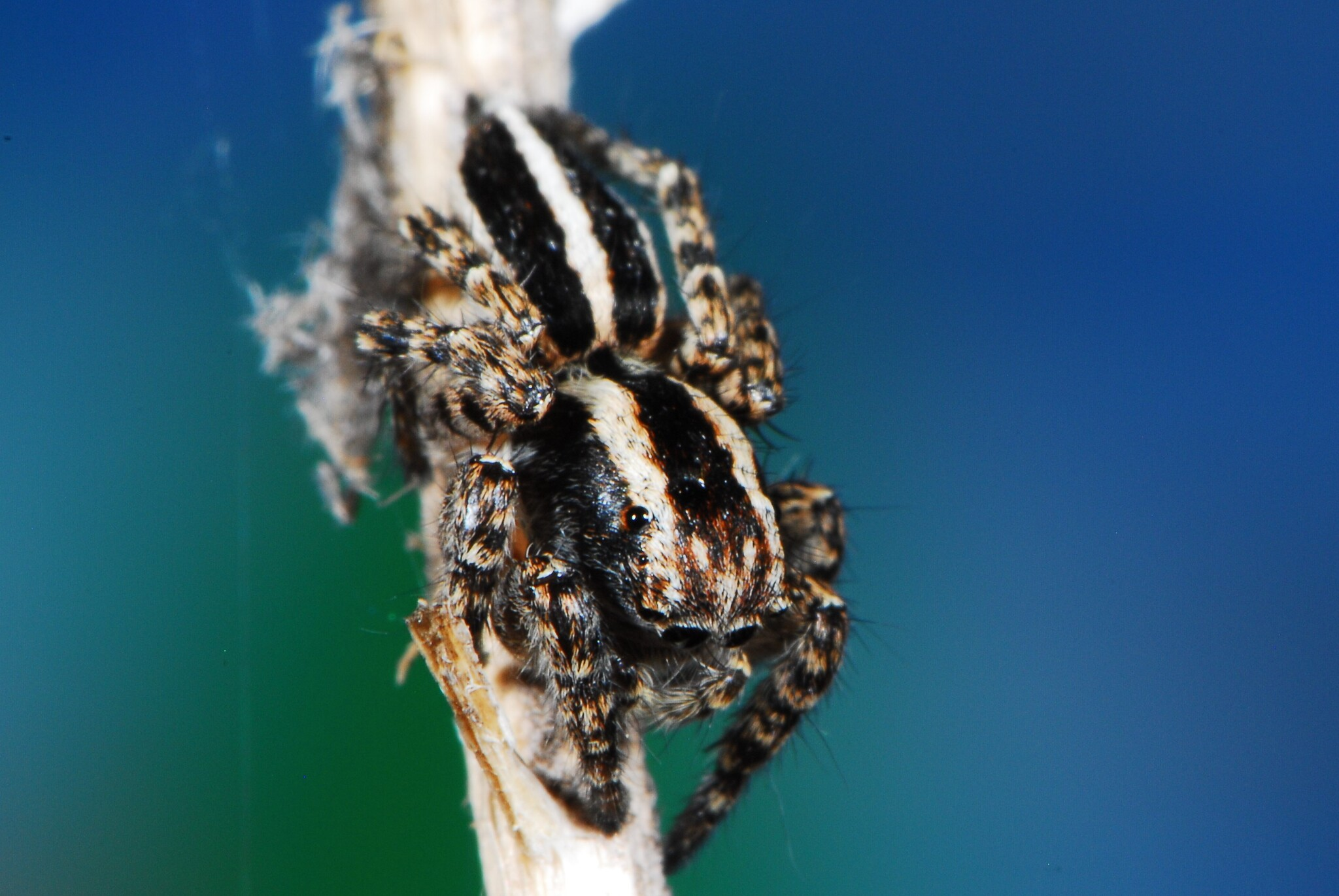
- Another view of the female spider

Scientific classification
- Kingdom: Animalia
- Phylum: Arthropoda
- Subphylum: Chelicerata
- Class: Arachnida
- Order: Araneae
- Infraorder: Araneomorphae
- Family: Salticidae
- Genus: Langona
- Species: L. warchalowskii

Binomial name
- Langona warchalowskii Wesołowska, 2007

= Langona warchalowskii =

Species of jumping spider

Langona warchalowskii is a species of jumping spider in the genus Langona that lives in South Africa. It was first described by Wanda Wesołowska in 2007. The spider is large with a carapace between 3 and 4 mm (0.12 and 0.16 in) long and a abdomen between 2.4 and 5.8 mm (0.094 and 0.228 in). The male is significantly smaller than the male and has deeper colours. The spider has a black head, dark brown thorax and brown-black abdomen. While all the spiders have two stripes along the carapace, some have one on the abdomen and some have three. The toothless chelicerae is typical of the genus. The male can be distinguished by its copulatory organs, and particularly its short and blunt tibial apophysis. The female also has distinctive copulatory organs, including an epigyne with two small depressions, the rims of which form a shield over the gonopores.

== Taxonomy ==
Langona warchalowskii is a species of jumping spider, a member of the family Salticidae, that was first described by the arachnologist Wanda Wesołowska in 2007. It is one of over 500 species identified by the Polish scientist during her career. The species was placed by Wesołowska in the genus Langona, which was first described by Eugène Simon in 1901. The genus was listed in the subtribe Aelurillina in the tribe Aelurillini by the Australian evolutionary biologst Wayne Maddison in 2015. These were allocated to the clade Saltafresia. In 2017, the arachnologist Jerzy Prószyński grouped the genus with nine other genera of jumping spiders under the name Aelurillines. It is particularly closely related to the genus Aelurillus, after which the group is named. The species is named after the Polish etymologist Andrzej Warchałowski.

== Description ==
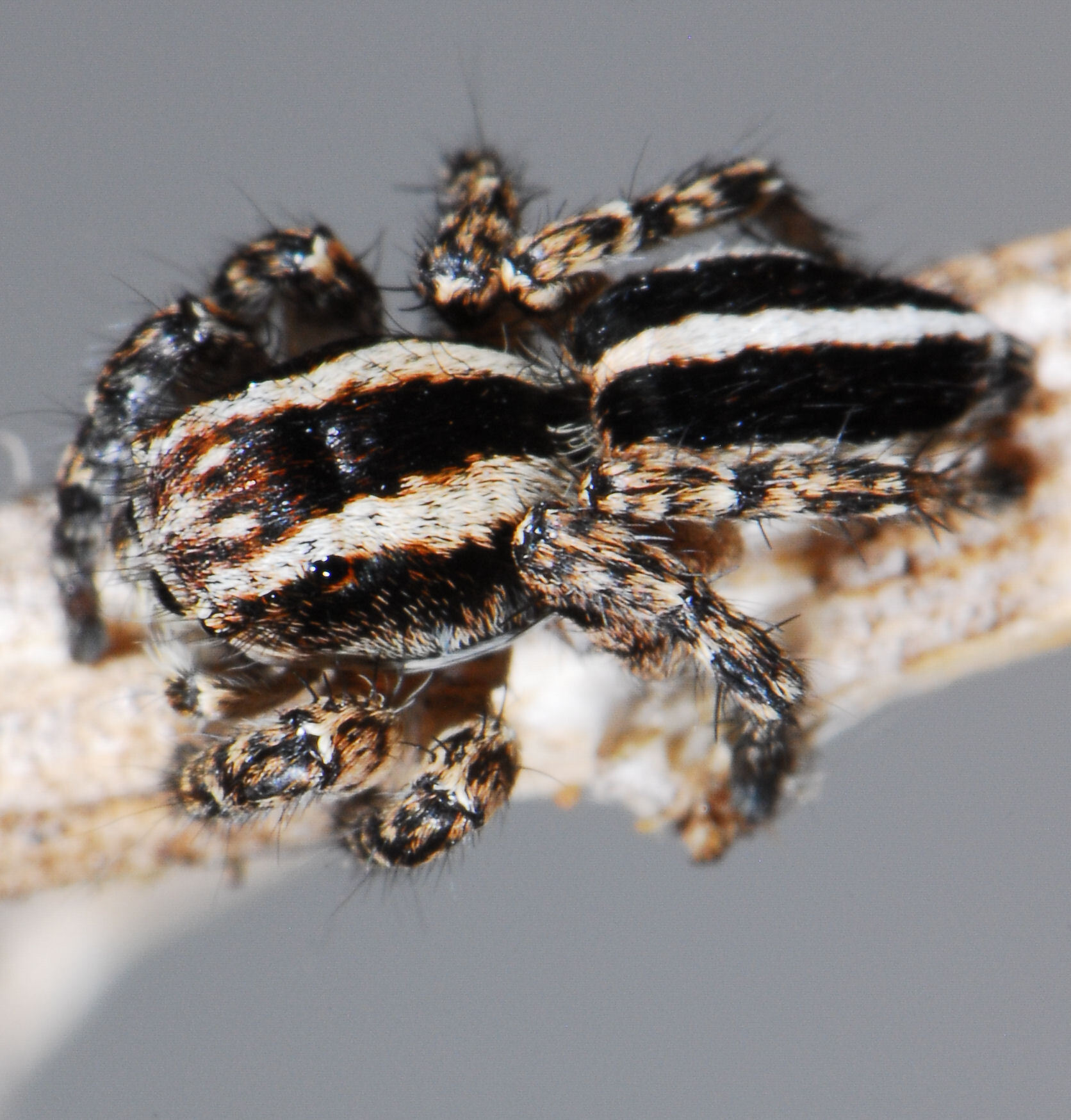
Close up of a female

Langona warchalowskii is large and hairy but Identifying the spider is difficult as the different Langona species generally cannot be distinguished from each other either their colours or the patterns that appear on their bodies. The spider has a body that is divided into two main parts: a rounded cephalothorax and a smaller and slightly tapered abdomen.

The male has a typical body length of 5.6 mm (0.22 in). It has a carapace, the hard upper part of the cephalothorax, that is between 3 and 3.4 mm (0.12 and 0.13 in) in length and 2.1 and 2.5 mm (0.083 and 0.098 in) in width. It is low and oval with two parallel lines of white setae running from the back of the eyes all the way to the end of the carapace. This stripy pattern is shared with the majority of Aelurillines. The underside of the cephalothorax, or sternum, is brownish. The spider's head is black and its thorax dark brown; the whole is covered in very small grey hairs. The short eye field has a dense covering of long brown bristles. The part of its face known as its clypeus is low and hairy, Its chelicerae are brown, toothless and bristly while the remaining mouthparts, labium and maxillae, are brown and yellow.

The top of the male's abdomen is brown-black with a one or three stripes of white setae down the middle and long brown bristles around the edge. Its underside is yellow-grey and sides are whitish. It is between 2.4 and 3.2 mm (0.094 and 0.126 in) long and between 1.8 and 2.5 mm (0.071 and 0.098 in) wide. Its spinnerets are brown, and Its legs are short, brown and hairy with many spikes.

It is easier to distinguish Langona spiders by observing their copulatory organs. The male spiders' pedipalps are marked by having a single protrusion, or apophysis. Langona warchalowskii has brown pedipalps that lack the outgrowth on the palpal femur that can be seen on its relatives. The pedipalp ends with a palpal tibia that has a single short tibial apophysis that is fringed with a tuft of long setae. Attached at the end are a very dark, almost black palpal bulb and cymbium. The bulb has a bulge that points down towards the tibia and, at the other end, another smaller bulge that leans over the start of the spider's very small embolus. There are long tufts of hair around the base and much of the bulb.

The female is significantly larger than the male, with a typical body length of 8.9 mm (0.35 in). It has a carapace that measures between 3.9 and 4 mm (0.15 and 0.16 in) long and 2.8 and 2.9 mm (0.11 and 0.11 in) wide and an abdomen that is 5.8 mm (0.23 in) in length and between 3.8 and 4.0 mm (0.15 and 0.16 in) in width. It is lighter in colour, with a grey abdomen that has a single light stripe with a dark border. Otherwise, it is similar is general appearance to the male.

The spider's epigyne, the visible external part of its copulatory organs. is unlike any other Langona species in external appearance. It has a two small depressions on the back, the rims forming a sort of shield above the gonopores. There are two copulatory openings that lead via wide and short insemination ducts, which are slightly sclerotised, to heavily sclerotised, multi-chambered receptacles, or spermathecae. Internally, there are distinctive accessory glands that protrude from the main copulatory organs and give them a more complex appearance.

Like other Lagona spiders, the spider's chelicerae are toothless. and there is a single apophysis, or appendage, on the pedipalp tibia, which enables it to be distinguished from other Aelurillinae. The male has a characteristic short and blunt tibial apophysis. It closely resembles the related Langona improcera, but the palpal bulb is wider and the rearmost lobe smaller. The female is similar to other species in the genus, the obvious accessory glands being the most distinctive feature.

== Distribution and habitat ==
Most Langona spiders are found in Africa and Eurasia. Langona warchalowskii is endemic to South Africa. The holotype was found in 1989 in Central Karoo, Western Cape, 25 kilometres (16 mi) east of Prince Albert. It has been found near Middelburg, Eastern Cape, Griekwastad, Northern Cape, Florisbad, Free State and in other areas of the country. It is a ground-dwelling spider that thrives in arid and semi-arid environments.
