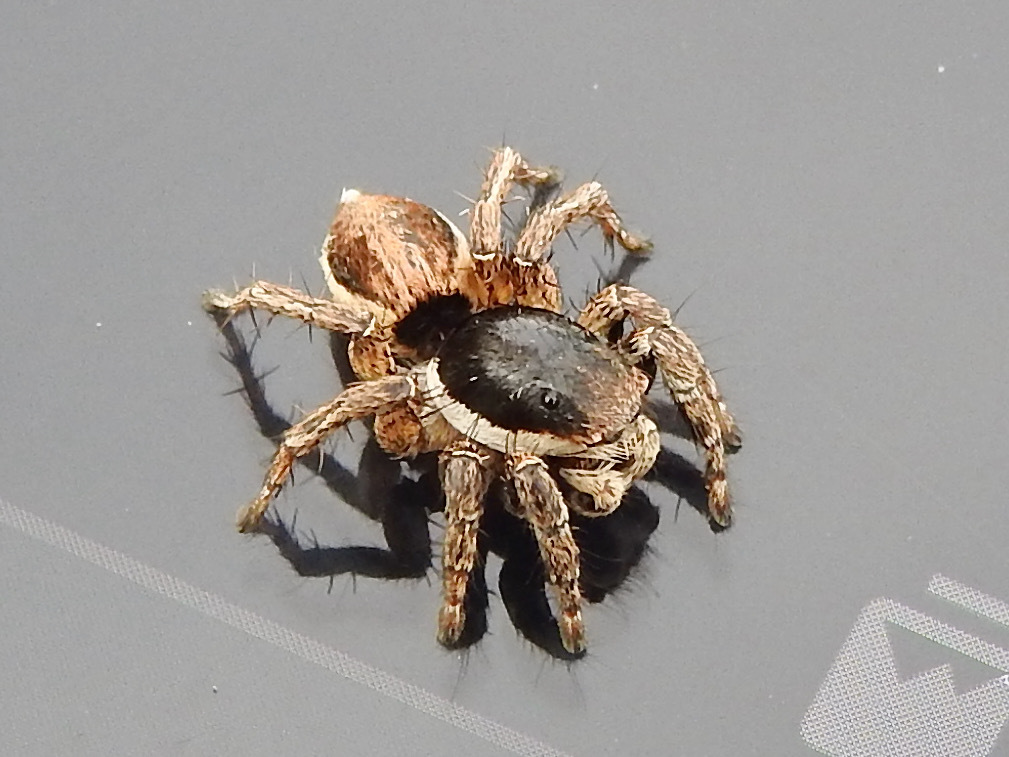
- A spider of the genus Langona

Scientific classification
- Kingdom: Animalia
- Phylum: Arthropoda
- Subphylum: Chelicerata
- Class: Arachnida
- Order: Araneae
- Infraorder: Araneomorphae
- Family: Salticidae
- Genus: Langona
- Species: L. mediocris

Binomial name
- Langona mediocris Wesołowska, 2000

= Langona mediocris =

Species of spider

Langona mediocris is a species of jumping spider in the genus Langona that lives in Zimbabwe. The male was first described by Wanda Wesołowska in 2000. The female has not been identified. The spider is large and brown-black with a carapace between 3 and 3.4 mm (0.12 and 0.13 in) long and an abdomen between 2.7 and 3.1 mm (0.11 and 0.12 in). The carapace has two converging white stripes while the abdomen has a single stripe. The legs are orange and the pedipalps yellow. As is typical for the genus, the chelicerae are toothless. The long, thin embolus is hidden within a pocket in the cymbium and has a spiralled tip. The male differs from the similar Langona bitumorata by the single bump on its palpal bulb.

== Taxonomy ==
Langona mediocris is a jumping spider first described by the Polish arachnologist Wanda Wesołowska in 2000. It is one of over 500 species she identified during her career. The species was placed by Wesołowska in the genus Langona, first described by Eugène Simon in 1901. It was listed in the subtribe Aelurillina in the tribe Aelurillini by Wayne Maddison in 2015. These were allocated to the clade Saltafresia. In 2017, the genus was grouped with nine other genera of jumping spiders under the name Aelurillines. It is particularly closely related to the genus Aelurillus, after which the subtribe, tribe and group are named. The different Langona species generally cannot be distinguished from each other or from other members of the group by either their colours or the patterns that appear on their bodies, but by the structure of the copulatory organs. The species is named for the Latin word for average.

== Description ==
The spider is large and hairy. The male has an oval carapace that is between 3 and 3.4 cm (1.2 and 1.3 in) in length and 2.1 and 2.4 cm (0.83 and 0.94 in) in width. It is brown-black with two converging lines of white hairs running from the back of the eyes all the way to the end of the carapace. The eye field is large, covering one third of the length. The abdomen is similar in colour with single stripes of white hair down the middle and a dense area of long hairs around the edge. The underside is yellow. It is between 2.7 and 3.1 cm (1.1 and 1.2 in) long and between 2 and 2.5 cm (0.79 and 0.98 in) wide. The clypeus is low and hairy. The chelicerae are orange and toothless with a hairy protrusion a bit like a moustache on the front. The legs are orange and hairy. The spinnerets are brown and the pedipalps yellow. The palpal bulb is bulbous and has a thin and hairy appendage, or apophysis, on the tibia that is relatively long. The embolus is long and thin, and hidden within a pocket in the cymbium. Its tip looks like a spiral. The female has not been described.

Like other Lagona spiders, the chelicerae are toothless. and there is a single apophysis on the pedipalp tibia, which enables it to be distinguished from other Aelurillinae. The male closely resembles the related Langona bitumorata, but can be distinguished by the single bump on the palpal bulb.

== Distribution ==
Langona mediocris is endemic to Zimbabwe. The holotype was found in 1990 in Manicaland.
