= Langona bethae =

Scientific classification
- Kingdom: Animalia
- Phylum: Arthropoda
- Subphylum: Chelicerata
- Class: Arachnida
- Order: Araneae
- Infraorder: Araneomorphae
- Family: Salticidae
- Genus: Langona
- Species: L. bethae

Binomial name
- Langona bethae Wesołowska & Cumming, 2011

Species of spider

Langona bethae is a species of jumping spider in the genus Langona that lives in Botswana and Zimbabwe. It has been found in dry savannah and under houses. The spider is large with a forward section, or cephalothorax, thst is between 2.6 and 3.5 mm (0.10 and 0.14 in) long and, behind that, an abdomen between 2.2 and 4.4 mm (0.087 and 0.173 in). The female is larger than the male. Adult spiders have a brown carapace, the upper surface of its cephalothorax, that has two white streaks on the thorax, and a black eye field. Juvenile spiders are plain yellow. The species has the toothless chelicerae typical of the genus but can be distinguished by its abdominal pattern, which has a yellow streak of an irregular shape. It also has distinctive copulatory organs. The male has a hidden embolus that is shorter than that on the related Langona pilosa. The female has copulatory organs that resemble Langelurillus ignorabilis but differ in the design of the seminal ducts. Courtship has been observed by both males and females. The spider was first described in 2011 by Wanda Wesołowska and Meg Cumming.

== Taxonomy and etymology ==
Langona bethae is a species of jumping spider, a member of the family Salticidae. The spider was first described by arachnologists Wanda Wesołowska and Meg Cumming in 2011. It was one of over 500 species identified by the Polish arachnologist. The species was placed in the genus Langona, first described by Eugène Simon in 1901. It was initially placed in the genus tentatively due to the similarity between it and spiders in the genus Langelurillus. It was listed in the subtribe Aelurillina in the tribe Aelurillini by Wayne Maddison in 2015. These were allocated to the clade Saltafresia. In 2017, the genus was grouped with nine other genera of jumping spiders under the name Aelurillines by Jerzy Prószyński. It is particularly closely related to the genus Aelurillus, after which the group is named. The species is named in honour of Meg Cumming's daughter Beth, who spent much of her childhood in the area of Zimbabwe where the species was first found and died before the species was described.

== Description ==
The spider is large and hairy. Its body is divided into two main parts: a pear-shaped oval cephalothorax and a smaller abdomen that is shaped like a rounded, house-shaped convex pentagon. The male has a cephalothorax that is between 2.6 and 2.9 mm (0.10 and 0.11 in) in length and 1.9 and 2.1 mm (0.075 and 0.083 in) in width. The spider's carapace, the hard upper part of the cephalothorax, is quite high and covered in brown and grayish hairs. It is brown and marked with two white streaks on its thorax. The spider has a black eye field that has yellow and fawn coloured hairs. There are white and yellow scales around some of its eyes. The part of its face known as its clypeus and the underside of its carapace, known as its sternum, are light brown. In some specimens, its sternum has a gray tint. It has toothless chelicerae, and its remaining mouthparts, including its labium and maxillae, are orange with pale edges.

The male's abdomen is between 2.2 and 2.5 mm (0.087 and 0.098 in) long and between 1.5 and 1.7 mm (0.059 and 0.067 in) wide. It is dark brown with a stripe down the middle composed of yellow hair that has an irregular and distinctive shape. In some of the examples of the species that have been collected, these hairs have been rubbed off, exposing a delicate, smooth, shield-like shell, or scutum. The underside is light. Its spinnerets are long, the rearmost pair being darker than the others. Its legs are brown-orange and have brown hairs. Its pedipalps are dark and hairy. The male's copulatory organs are distinctive. Its papal tibia has a very thin, long, and curved spike, or tibial apophysis. It lacks the tuft of stiff hair that is typically found on spiders of the genus. Instead, there is a tuft of stiff black hair on the outside of its tibial joint. It has a embolus that is hidden in a pocket in the cymbium and is coiled into the tip of the palpal bulb.

The female is larger than the male, with a cephalothorax that measures between 3.4 and 3.5 mm (0.13 and 0.14 in) long and 2.5 and 2.6 mm (0.098 and 0.102 in) wide and an abdomen that is between 3.5 and 4.4 mm (0.14 and 0.17 in) in length and 2.9 and 3.9 mm (0.11 and 0.15 in) in width. It has similar colours to the male, but the pattern on the abdomen is more prominent, with light patches accompanying the stripe that runs down the middle, and its eye field has a pattern of five indistinct spots. Its legs are similar but are slightly shorter. Its epigyne, the external visible part of the female's copulatory organs, has a narrow depression that is shaped like a crescent. Its copulatory openings are relatively widely spaced and lead to bean-shaped, single-chambered spermathecae.

Like other Lagona spiders, its chelicerae are toothless. There is a single apophysis, or appendage, on the pedipalp tibia, which enables it to be distinguished from other Aelurillinae. The species resembles the related Langona pilosa, but may be identified by the distinctive pattern on the abdomen. The male differs in having a shorter apophysis on the tibia and a shorter embolus. The female's receptacles are further from the rear and in the other species are found in the ridge at the back of the spider's epigyne, known as its epigastric furrow. The female is also similar to other species in the genus, its internal design of its epigyne being particularly similar to Langelurillus ignorabilis, but differs in the morphology of the seminal ducts.

== Behavior ==
Unlike other species in the genus, examples of Langona bethae in all life stages have been found together at the same time. Juvenile spiders differ from adults significantly, not least in that they are plain yellow. Courtship has been observed by both males and females. A female was seen to shake from side to side while standing on a seed pod, to which a male responded by beating, then opening and closing its pedipalps. In another instance, a male was seen moving its body from side to side while a female responded by moving about 1 m (3 ft 3 in) away. It remained camouflaged in sandy soil while the male sat amongst leaf litter.

== Distribution and habitat ==
Langona bethae is found in Botswana and Zimbabwe. The holotype was found in the Sengwa Wildlife Research Area, Zimbabwe, in 2002. The spider was subsequently also seen in Chizarira National Park in 2009. An example from Matabeleland that had been collected in 1990 was also assigned to the species. The spider also lives in Botswana. The first example was discovered in the Okavango Delta in 2006. Langona bethae lives in dry savannah, and is also known to live under houses.
