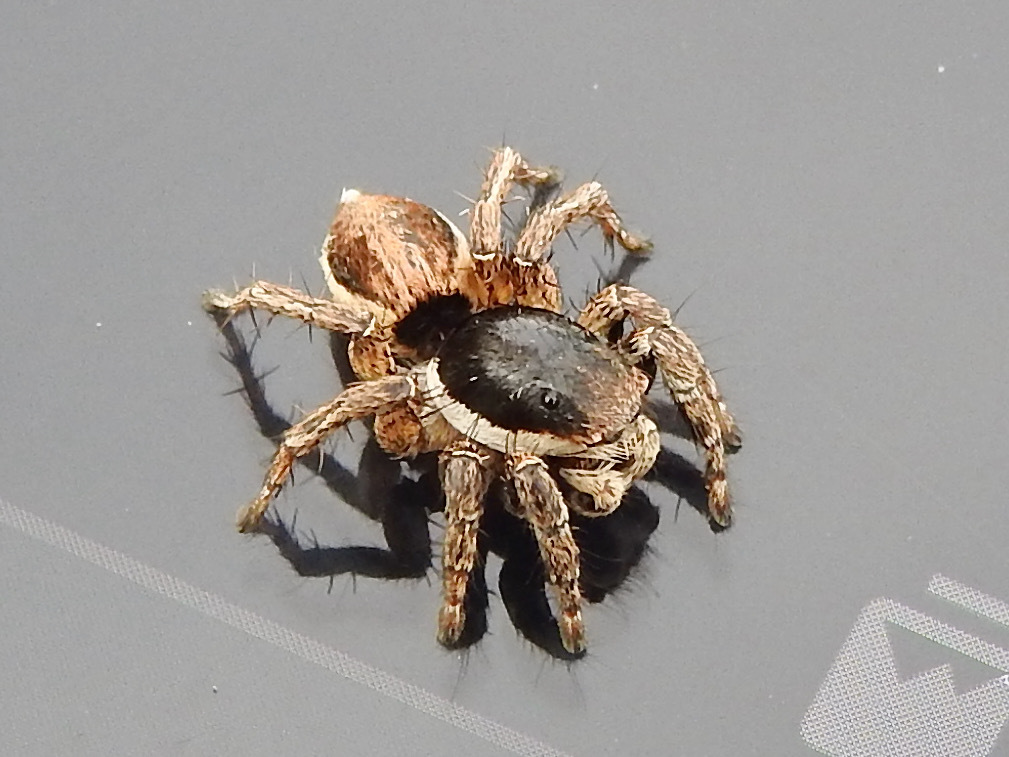
- A spider of the genus Langona

Scientific classification
- Kingdom: Animalia
- Phylum: Arthropoda
- Subphylum: Chelicerata
- Class: Arachnida
- Order: Araneae
- Infraorder: Araneomorphae
- Family: Salticidae
- Genus: Langona
- Species: L. vitiosa

Binomial name
- Langona vitiosa Wesołowska, 2006

= Langona vitiosa =

Species of spider

Langona vitiosa is a species of jumping spider in the genus Langona that lives in Namibia. The male was first described by Wanda Wesołowska in 2006. The female has not been identified. The spider is small with a dark brown carapace between 2.2 and 2.3 mm (0.087 and 0.091 in) long and a brown-black abdomen between 1.8 and 1.9 mm (0.071 and 0.075 in). The spider has two white stripes on its carapace and a single white stripe on its abdomen, and the toothless chelicerae typical of the genus. The spider can be best distinguished by its copulatory organs, and particularly the existence of one small bump near to the sole appendage on the pedipalp tibia, which also lacks the setae that can be found on other species.

== Taxonomy ==
Langona vitiosa is a jumping spider that was first described by Wanda Wesołowska in 2006. It was one of over 500 species identified by the Polish arachnologist during her career. She placed it in the genus Langona, first described by Eugène Simon in 1901. It was listed in the subtribe Aelurillina in the tribe Aelurillini, both named after the genus, by Wayne Maddison in 2015. These were allocated to the clade Saltafresia. In 2017, the genus was grouped with nine other genera of jumping spiders under the name Aelurillines. It is particularly closely related to the genus Aelurillus, after which the group is named. The different Langona species generally cannot be distinguished from each other or from other members of the group by either their colours or the patterns that appear on their bodies, but by the structure of the copulatory organs. The species is named after the Latin word vitium, which can be translated fault. This refers to the lack of setae on the appendage on its pedipalp tibia, which can usually be found on spiders of the genus.

== Description ==
The spider is large and hairy. The male has a pear-shaped carapace that is between 2.2 and 2.3 mm (0.087 and 0.091 in) in length and between 1.5 and 1.6 mm (0.059 and 0.063 in) in width. It is mainly dark brown in color with two distinctive white stripes made of white hairs. It has a short eye field with fawn-grey hairs lining the front. The sides are hairy as well. The abdomen is brown-black and has a white stripe along the back. The underside is a similar color. It is between 1.8 and 1.9 mm (0.071 and 0.075 in) long and between 1.2 and 1.4 mm (0.047 and 0.055 in) wide. The clypeus is low, brown and hairy. The chelicerae are yellow brown. The front spinnerets are lighter and shorter and the rear ones, which are brown. The legs are yellow and covered with brown hairs. The pedipalps are yellow or light brown and have a covering of long white hairs. The palpal bulb has small white hairs to the rear, and a coiled embolus that is hidden in a pocket in the cymbium. The female has not been described.

Like other Lagona spiders, the chelicerae are toothless. and there is a single apophysis, or appendage, on the pedipalp tibia, which enables it to be distinguished from other Aelurillinae. It closely resembles the related Langona bitumorata, but can be identified by the presence of a single small bump on the pedipalp tibia where the other species has two.

== Distribution and habitat ==
The spider is endemic to Namibia. It was found near the Brandberg Mountain, the holotype being collected in 2000. It lives at higher altitudes than other species found in the area.
