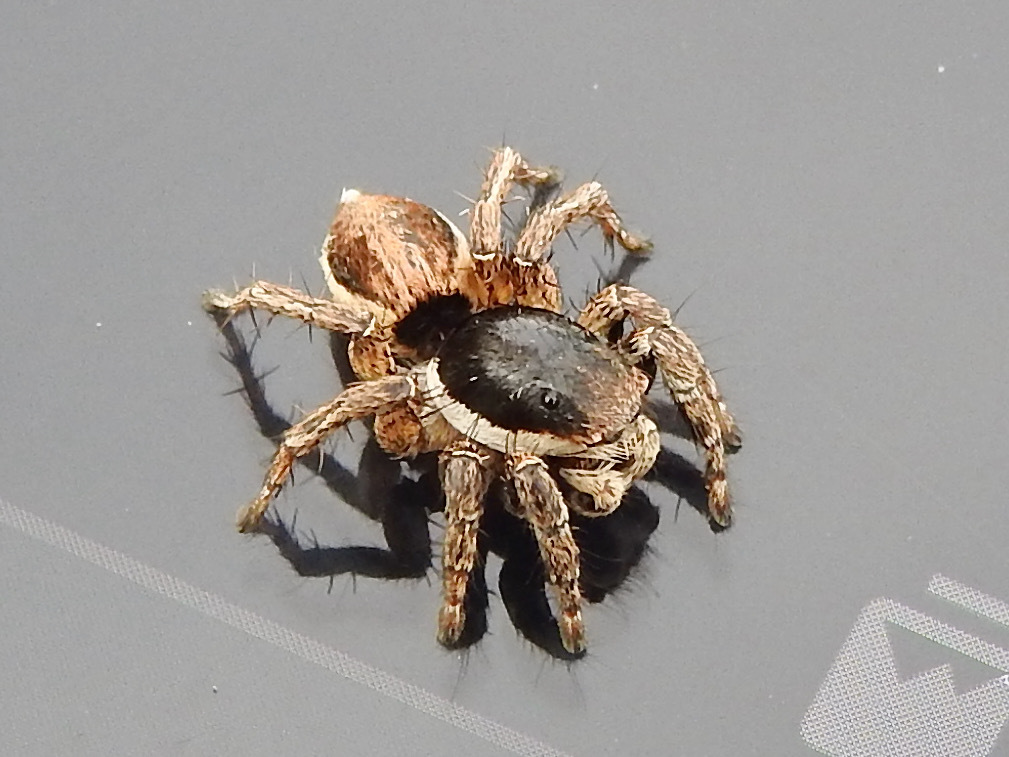
- A spider of the genus Langona

Scientific classification
- Kingdom: Animalia
- Phylum: Arthropoda
- Subphylum: Chelicerata
- Class: Arachnida
- Order: Araneae
- Infraorder: Araneomorphae
- Family: Salticidae
- Genus: Langona
- Species: L. pilosa

Binomial name
- Langona pilosa Wesołowska, 2006

= Langona pilosa =

Species of spider

Langona pilosa is a species of jumping spider in the genus Langona that lives in Namibia. The male was first described by Wanda Wesołowska in 2006 and the female in 2011. The spider is small with a cephalothorax between 2.2 and 3.1 mm (0.087 and 0.122 in) long and an abdomen between 2.1 and 3.5 mm (0.083 and 0.138 in). The female is larger than the male. The spider has a brown carapace that has two white stripes on its back, a large dark patch on its yellowish abdomen, a black eye field and the toothless chelicerae typical of the genus. The male can be distinguished from others in the genus by the existence of tufts around the palpal bulb, after which it is named, and the very long and thin tibial apophysis. The female has copulatory organs that resemble Langelurillus ignorabilis but differ in the design of the seminal ducts.

== Taxonomy ==
Langona pilosa is a jumping spider species first described by Wanda Wesołowska in 2006. It was one of over 500 species identified by the Polish arachnologist during her career. She placed it in the genus Langona, first described by Eugène Simon in 1901. It was listed in the subtribe Aelurillina in the tribe Aelurillini by Wayne Maddison in 2015. These were allocated to the clade Saltafresia. In 2017, the genus was grouped with nine other genera of jumping spiders under the name Aelurillines. It is particularly closely related to the genus Aelurillus, after which the subtribe, tribe and group are named. The different Langona species generally cannot be distinguished from each other or from other members of the group by either their colours or the patterns that appear on their bodies, but by the structure of the copulatory organs. The species is named for the tuft of spikes on the palpal bulb.

== Description ==
The spider is large and hairy. The male has a cephalothorax that is between 2.2 and 2.8 mm (0.087 and 0.110 in) in length and 1.7 and 1.9 mm (0.067 and 0.075 in) in width. The carapace is long, high and pear-shaped. It is brown with a short black eye field that has short white spines at the front and brown bristles along the back. It is otherwise covered in white hairs. The thorax has two stripes made of white hairs. The abdomen is yellowish with a large brown shell-like covering that takes up nearly two-thirds of the surface. It has light sides and a light stripe on the top. There is also often a patch that is shaped like a leaf. It is between 2.1 and 2.5 mm (0.083 and 0.098 in) long and between 1.6 and 1.9 mm (0.063 and 0.075 in) wide. The underside is yellow. The clypeus is light brown and hairy. The chelicerae are orange and the spinnerets are black. The legs are yellow-orange and covered with brown hairs and long spines. The pedipalps are brown and have a covering of long white hairs on the top and long black hairs underneath. The palpal bulb and cymbium are very dark, almost black, and has long tufts of hair around the base and much of the bulb. The tibial apophysis is very thin and long. The embolus is small and curved. There is a small bump on the outside of the tibia.

The female is larger than the male, with a cephalothorax that measures between 3 and 3.1 mm (0.12 and 0.12 in) long and 2.2 and 2.3 mm (0.087 and 0.091 in) wide and an abdomen that is between 2.9 and 3.5 mm (0.11 and 0.14 in) in length and 2.3 and 2.7 mm (0.091 and 0.106 in) in width. It is generally less colourful than the male. The eye field has a pattern of five indistinct spots. The epigyne has a narrow depression that is shaped like a horse shoe. The copulatory openings lead to relatively short and wide seminal ducts.

Like other Lagona spiders, the chelicerae are toothless. and there is a single apophysis, or appendage, on the pedipalp tibia, which enables it to be distinguished from other Aelurillinae. The male can be clearly identified by the design of its copulatory organs, are particularly the tuft after which it is named and length of the tibial apophysis. It closely resembles the related Langona bethae, but has a longer embolus. The female is similar to other species in the genus, although the internal design of the epigyne is similar to Langelurillus ignorabilis, but differs in the morphology of the seminal ducts.

== Distribution and habitat ==
Langona pilosa is endemic to Namibia. It was found near the Brandberg Mountain, the holotype being collected in 1999. It has also been found in the Etosha National Park and in the vicinity of Windhoek. It seems to thrive in rocky areas and in the karoo bush.
