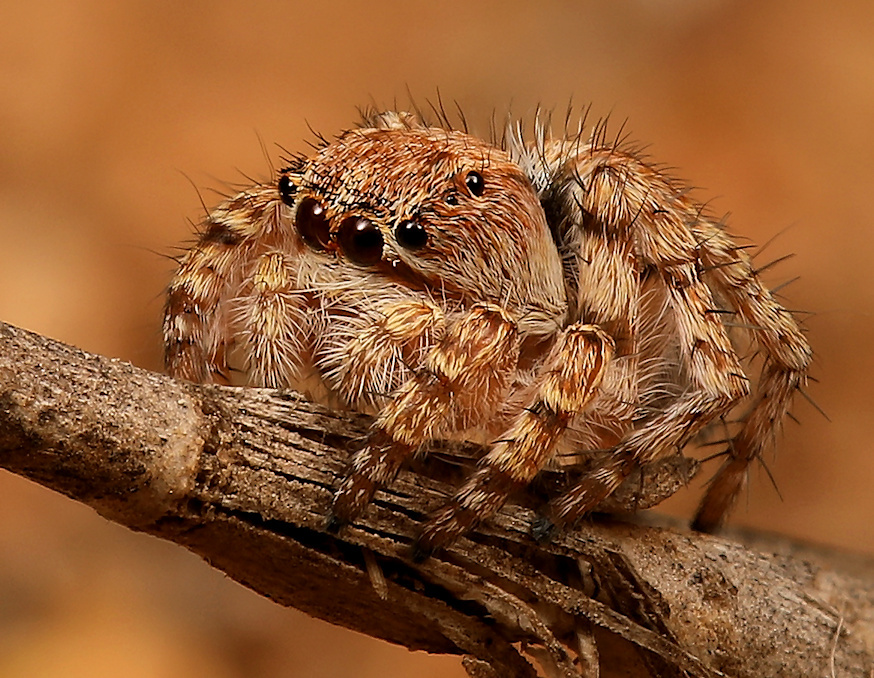
- L. hirsuta
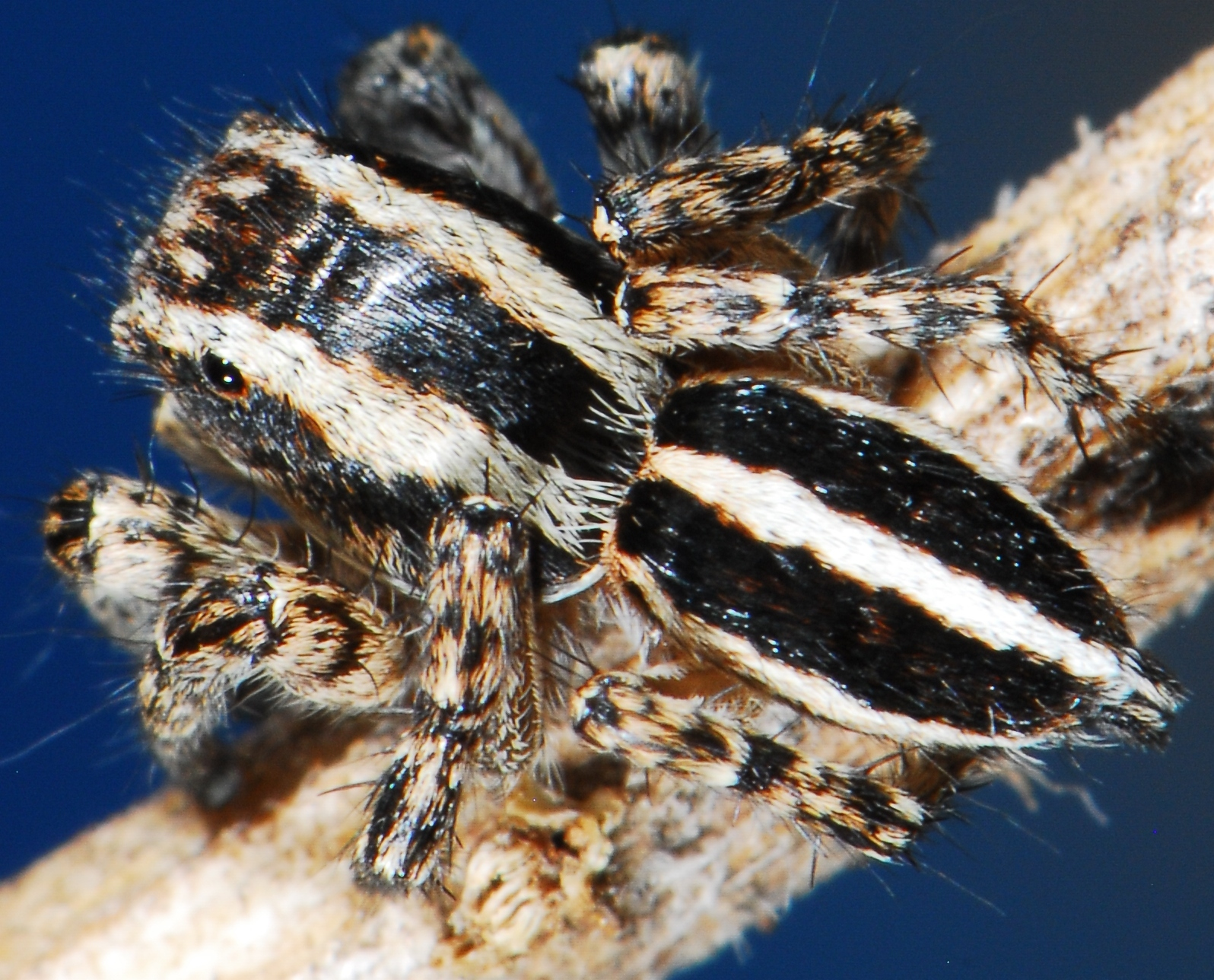
- L. warchalowskii

Scientific classification
- Kingdom: Animalia
- Phylum: Arthropoda
- Subphylum: Chelicerata
- Class: Arachnida
- Order: Araneae
- Infraorder: Araneomorphae
- Family: Salticidae
- Tribe: Aelurillini
- Genus: Langona; Simon, 1901

Type species
- Attus redii Audouin, 1826

Species
- See text

= Langona =

Genus of spiders

Langona is a genus of spiders in the family Salticidae (jumping spiders). Langona species are similar to those of the genus Aelurillus. In 2015, it was listed in the subtribe Aelurillina. The subtribe is allocated to the tribe Aelurillini in the clade Saltafresia. In 2017, it was grouped with nine other genera of jumping spiders under the name Aelurillines.

== Species ==
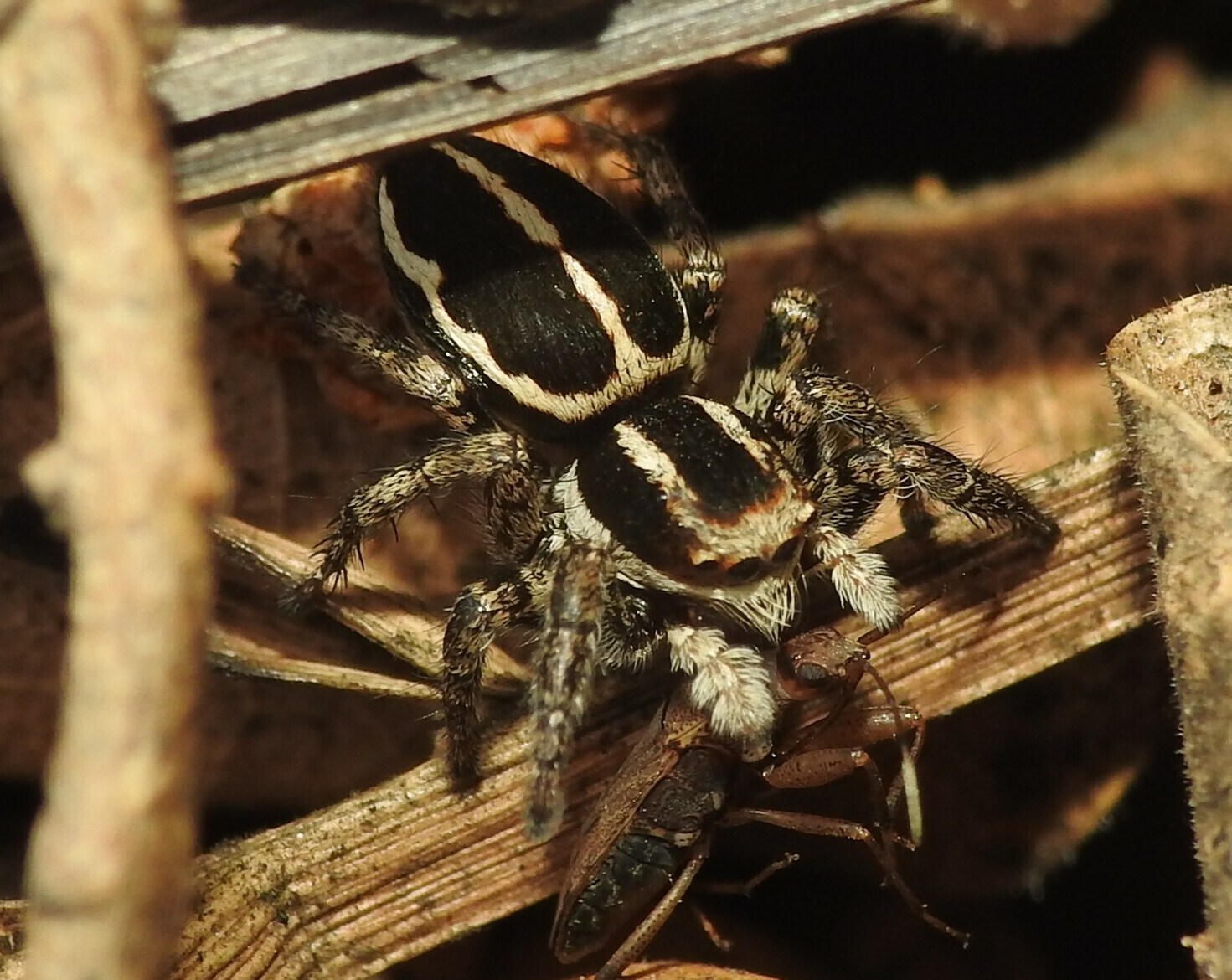
L. davidi

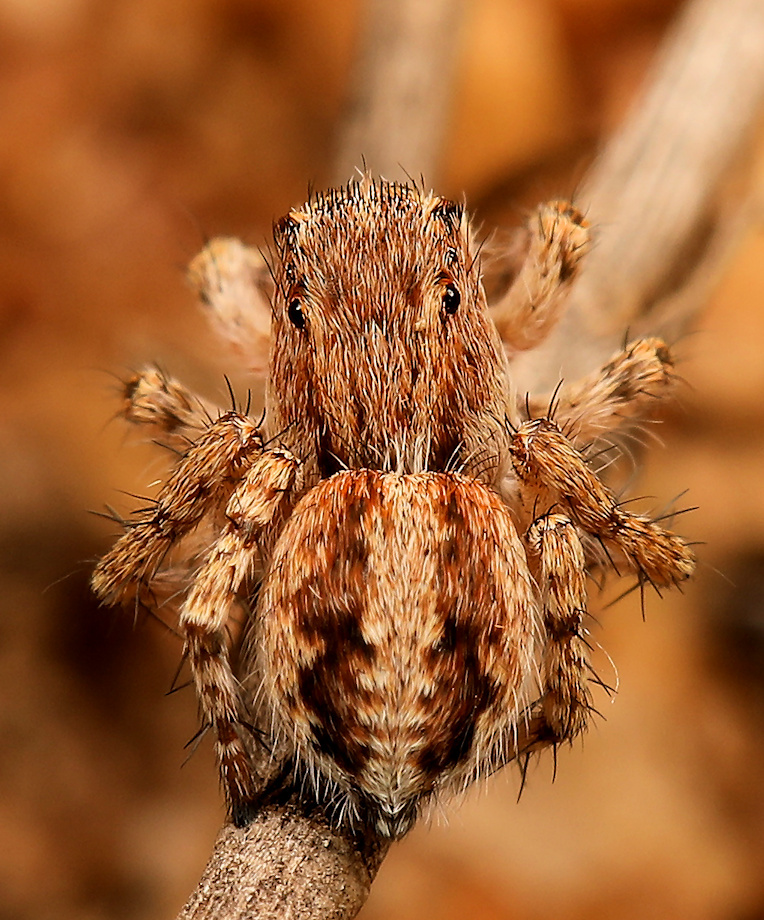
L. hirsuta

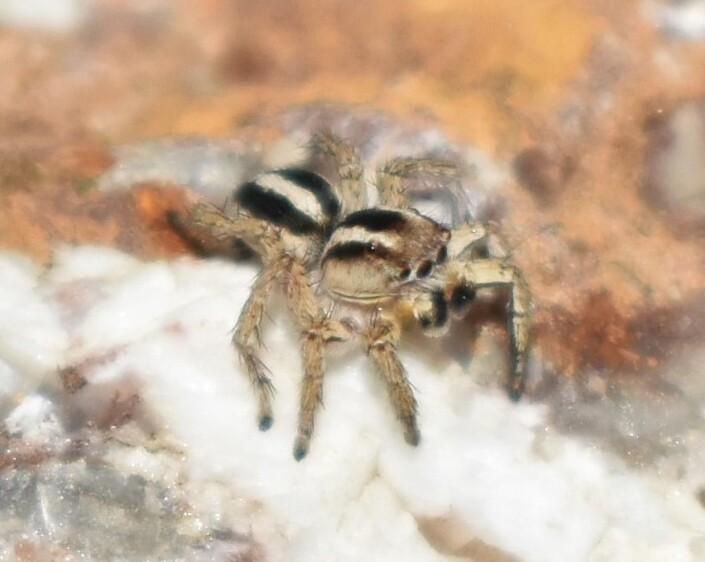
L. tartarica

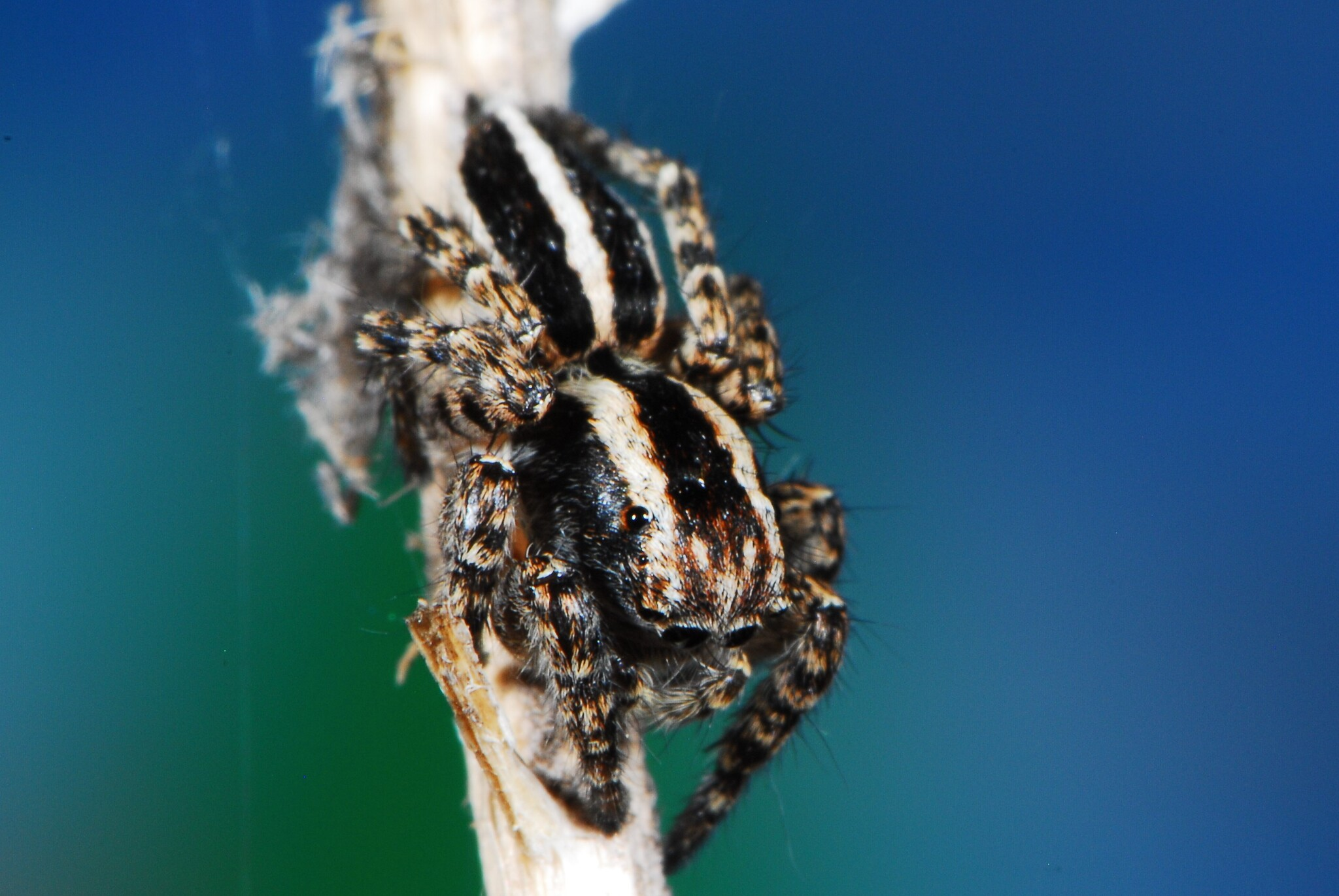
L. warchalowskii

As of October 2025, this genus includes 45 species:

- Langona albolinea Caleb & Mathai, 2015 – India
- Langona alfensis Hęciak & Prószyński, 1983 – Egypt, Sudan, Ethiopia
- Langona aperta (Denis, 1958) – Iran, Afghanistan, India
- Langona atrata Peng & Li, 2008 – China
- Langona avara G. W. Peckham & E. G. Peckham, 1903 – Zimbabwe
- Langona bethae Wesołowska & Cumming, 2011 – Botswana, Zimbabwe
- Langona bhutanica Prószyński, 1978 – Bhutan, China
- Langona biangula Peng, Li & Yang, 2004 – China
- Langona bisecta Lawrence, 1927 – Namibia
- Langona bitumorata Próchniewicz & Hęciak, 1994 – Tanzania
- Langona bristowei Berland & Millot, 1941 – Senegal, Guinea, Nigeria, Uganda
- Langona davidi (Caleb, Mungkung & Mathai, 2015) – India
- Langona fusca Wesołowska, 2011 – Zimbabwe
- Langona goaensis Prószyński, 1992 – India
- Langona hirsuta Haddad & Wesołowska, 2011 – South Africa
- Langona hongkong Song, Xie, Zhu & Wu, 1997 – China
- Langona improcera Wesołowska & Russell-Smith, 2000 – Tanzania
- Langona kurracheensis Hęciak & Prószyński, 1983 – Pakistan
- Langona lotzi Haddad & Wesołowska, 2011 – South Africa, Lesotho
- Langona maculata Peng, Li & Yang, 2004 – China
- Langona magna Caporiacco, 1947 – Ethiopia
- Langona maindroni (Simon, 1886) – Senegal
- Langona mallezi (Denis, 1947) – Egypt
- Langona manicata Simon, 1901 – South Africa
- Langona mediocris Wesołowska, 2000 – Zimbabwe
- Langona minima Caporiacco, 1949 – Kenya
- Langona oreni Prószyński, 2000 – Israel
- Langona pallida Prószyński, 1993 – Saudi Arabia, United Arab Emirates, Afghanistan
- Langona pallidula Logunov & Rakov, 1998 – Iran, Turkmenistan
- Langona pattayensis Żabka & Patoleta, 2020 – Thailand
- Langona pecten Próchniewicz & Hęciak, 1994 – Kenya, Tanzania, Zimbabwe
- Langona pilosa Wesołowska, 2006 – Namibia
- Langona redii (Audouin, 1826) – Egypt, Israel, Syria, Yemen, Iran (type species)
- Langona sabulosa Wesołowska, 2011 – Namibia
- Langona senegalensis Berland & Millot, 1941 – Senegal
- Langona simoni Hęciak & Prószyński, 1983 – Pakistan
- Langona spiralis Haddad, Wiśniewski & Wesołowska, 2024 – Mozambique
- Langona tartarica (Charitonov, 1946) – Iran, Turkmenistan, Uzbekistan, Tajikistan, Afghanistan, Pakistan, China, Yemen?
- Langona tigrina (Simon, 1886) – India
- Langona tortuosa Wesołowska, 2011 – Namibia, Zimbabwe, Mozambique, South Africa
- Langona trifoveolata (Lessert, 1927) – Guinea, Ivory Coast, Ghana, DR Congo, Mozambique
- Langona ukualuthensis Lawrence, 1927 – Namibia
- Langona vitiosa Wesołowska, 2006 – Namibia
- Langona warchalowskii Wesołowska, 2007 – South Africa
- Langona zimbabwensis Wesołowska & Cumming, 2011 – Zimbabwe
