= Certa =

Certa may refer to:

== People ==
- Hussein Khodja (died 1857, born as Giuseppe Certa), Tunisian politician
- Joe Certa, creator of the DC Comics character Martian Manhunter
- Scott Certa, bassist for U.S. band Exotic Animal Petting Zoo

== Places ==
- Château Pèlerin, Atlit, Israel; during the Roman Era known as "Certa"

== Transportation and vehicles ==
- MS Certa, an Italian ship, formerly CCGS John Cabot (1965)
- Autobianchi Y10 Certa, a model of the Y10 citycar from Autobianchi

== Other uses ==
- Certa (oil), an Irish oil brand
- "La Certa" (dance), a winning performance dance at the Eurovision Young Dancers 2017

== See also ==
- Ercheia certa (E. certa), a species of moth
- Eupithecia certa (E. certa), a species of moth
- Evarcha certa (E. certa), a species of jumping spider
- Oinophila certa (O. certa), a species of moth
- Phlegra certa (P. certa), a species of jumping spider
- Plusia certa (P. certa), a species of moth
