= Phlegra varia =

Scientific classification
- Kingdom: Animalia
- Phylum: Arthropoda
- Subphylum: Chelicerata
- Class: Arachnida
- Order: Araneae
- Infraorder: Araneomorphae
- Family: Salticidae
- Genus: Phlegra
- Species: P. varia

Binomial name
- Phlegra varia Wesołowska & Russell-Smith, 2000

Species of spider

Phlegra varia is a jumping spider species in the genus Phlegra that lives in Tanzania. The female was first described in 2000. It is closely related to Phlegra bresnieri and Phlegra chrysops.
