= Phlegra lineata =

- male from 1846 description

Scientific classification
- Kingdom: Animalia
- Phylum: Arthropoda
- Subphylum: Chelicerata
- Class: Arachnida
- Order: Araneae
- Infraorder: Araneomorphae
- Family: Salticidae
- Genus: Phlegra
- Species: P. lineata

Binomial name
- Phlegra lineata (C. L. Koch, 1846)

Synonyms
- Euophrys lineata C. L. Koch, 1846; Parthenia lineata (Simon, 1864); Attus lineatus (Simon, 1868); Ictidops lineatus (Pavesi, 1878)

Species of spider

Phlegra lineata is a species of jumping spider of the genus Phlegra. It is found across southern Europe, extending to the Canary Islands, Turkey, Syria, and the Caucasus region of Russia.

== Etymology ==
The specific name lineata is derived from the Latin word meaning "lined" or "striped", referring to the characteristic longitudinal stripes on the spider's opisthosoma.

== Distribution ==
P. lineata has been recorded from the Canary Islands, southern Europe including Greece, Turkey, Syria, and the Caucasus region of Russia. Recent records from Dagestan represent the northeasternmost extent of the species' range.

== Habitat ==
The species inhabits various dry environments, including coastal areas, sand dunes, and rocky slopes. It has been collected from tidal salt marshes as well as very dry habitats such as limestone cliffs by the sea.

== Description ==
Females of P. lineata have a light sand-colored prosoma with white hairs overall, and a longitudinal stripe on each side marked with dark brown hairs extending from the anterior lateral eyes to shortly before the posterior edge of the cephalothorax. The clypeus is densely covered with white hairs, while the eye surrounds are dark. The opisthosoma is dorsally densely covered with white hairs and features two narrow lateral and two broad median orange stripes bordered by black hairs, which extend to the dark brown spinneret region. The legs are light sand-colored with standing white hairs.

Males are dark brown with two dorsal and two lateral closely adjacent white-haired longitudinal bands. The prosoma has orange-brown edges, with the lateral head plate being darkly bristled and the eye surrounds black. The entire cephalic region is orange-brown and hairy. The clypeus is long-standing white-haired, while other mouthparts are orange-brown ventrally white. The opisthosoma is dorsally dark brown with a median and two lateral orange-brown bordered white longitudinal stripes. The legs are dark brown with longitudinal markings, overall standing black and closely adjacent gray-white haired.

== Taxonomy ==
The species was originally described by C. L. Koch in 1846 as Euophrys lineata. It has undergone several generic reassignments throughout its taxonomic history, being placed in the genera Parthenia, Attus, and Ictidops before its current placement in Phlegra. The species closely resembles Phlegra bresnieri, but can be distinguished by differences in the male palpal bulb structure and the coloration patterns.
