= Phlegra procera =

Scientific classification
- Kingdom: Animalia
- Phylum: Arthropoda
- Subphylum: Chelicerata
- Class: Arachnida
- Order: Araneae
- Infraorder: Araneomorphae
- Family: Salticidae
- Genus: Phlegra
- Species: P. procera

Binomial name
- Phlegra procera Wesołowska & Cumming, 2008

Species of spider

Phlegra procera is a jumping spider species in the genus Phlegra that lives in Zimbabwe.
