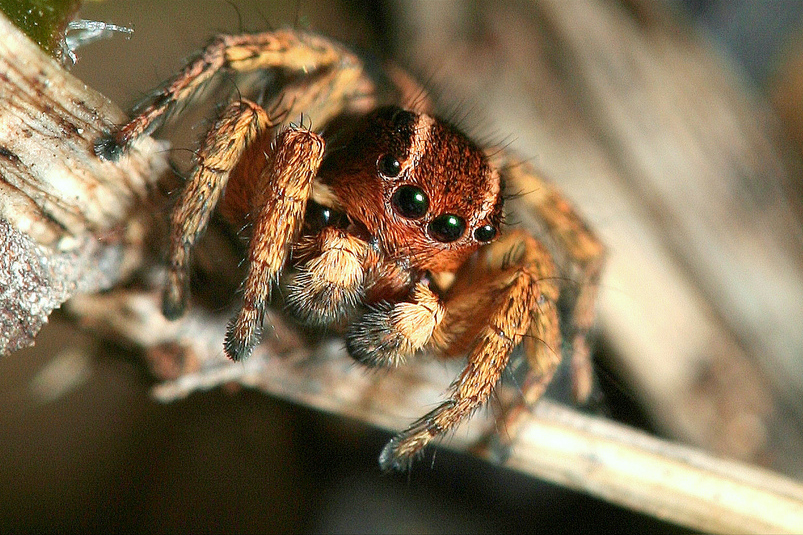
- Female Phlegra fasciata
- Illustration of male

Scientific classification
- Kingdom: Animalia
- Phylum: Arthropoda
- Subphylum: Chelicerata
- Class: Arachnida
- Order: Araneae
- Infraorder: Araneomorphae
- Family: Salticidae
- Genus: Phlegra
- Species: P. fasciata

Binomial name
- Phlegra fasciata (Hahn, 1826)

Synonyms
- Aranea elegans Fabricius, 1793; Attus fasciatus Hahn, 1826; Attus niger Sundevall, 1833; Attus divisus Walckenaer, 1837; Euophrys aprica C. L. Koch, 1846; Phlegra loripes Simon, 1876; Aelurops nobilis L. Koch, 1876; Phlegra delesserti Schenkel, 1918

= Phlegra fasciata =

Species of spider

Phlegra fasciata is a species of jumping spider in the family Salticidae. The species is widely distributed across the Palearctic region.

== Etymology ==
The specific epithet fasciata comes from the Latin word meaning "banded" or "striped", describing the characteristic white bands across the spider's dark body.

== Description ==
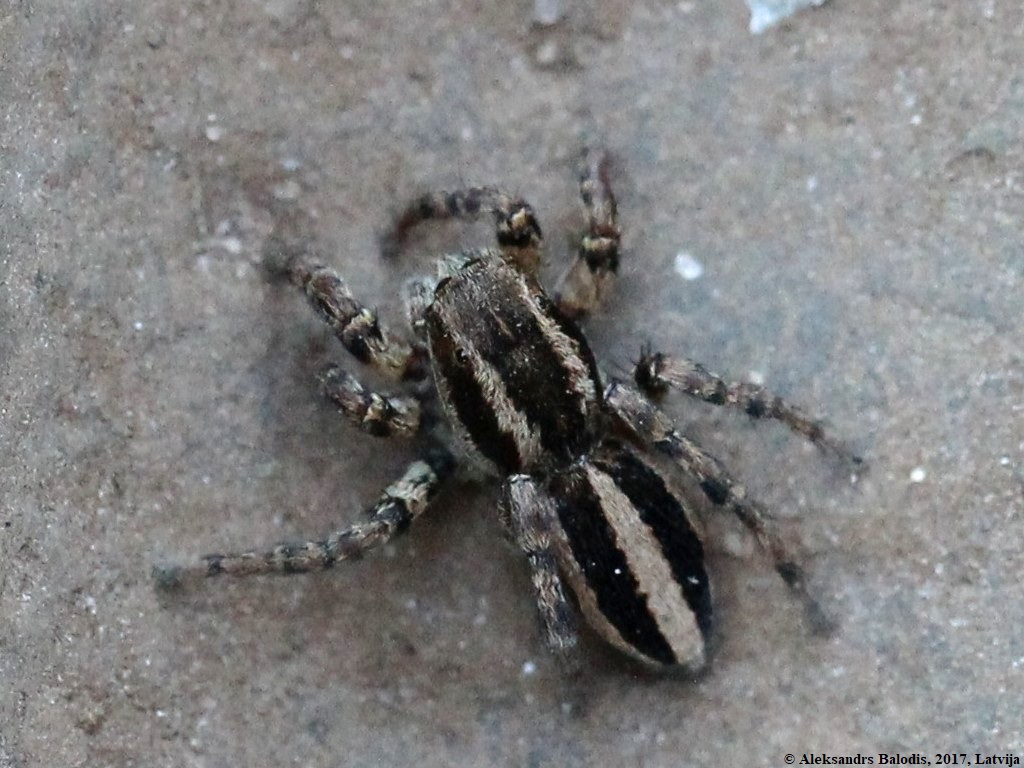
P. fasciata from Latvia

Like many jumping spiders, Phlegra fasciata exhibits distinct sexual dimorphism in both size and coloration. Females are larger than males, measuring 6–8 mm in body length, while males are 5–6 mm long.

The female has a golden brown to black cephalothorax with two white bands on the dorsal surface and a white border along the margins. The opisthosoma is golden brown to black with a distinctive white median band running longitudinally and white stripes along the sides. White hairs are present beneath the anterior eyes, and the legs and pedipalps show annulated (ringed) patterns.

Males are almost entirely golden brown to black in coloration. While they possess markings similar to females, these are much fainter and more difficult to distinguish, giving males a generally darker appearance.

== Distribution ==
P. fasciata has an extensive range across the Palearctic region, including Europe, Turkey, the Caucasus, Russia (from European regions to the Far East), Kazakhstan, Central Asia, Iran, Afghanistan, India, China, Mongolia, Korea, and Japan.

== Habitat ==
The species primarily inhabits sandy and stony areas with sparse vegetation.

== Taxonomy ==
The species was first described by Carl Wilhelm Hahn in 1826 as Attus fasciatus. It has been placed in various genera throughout its taxonomic history, including Aranea, Attus, Euophrys, Aelurops, and Salticus, before being transferred to the genus Phlegra by Eugène Simon in 1876. Several species originally described separately, including Phlegra loripes Simon, 1876 and Phlegra delesserti Schenkel, 1918, have since been synonymized with P. fasciata.
