= Phlegra solitaria =

Scientific classification
- Kingdom: Animalia
- Phylum: Arthropoda
- Subphylum: Chelicerata
- Class: Arachnida
- Order: Araneae
- Infraorder: Araneomorphae
- Family: Salticidae
- Genus: Phlegra
- Species: P. solitaria

Binomial name
- Phlegra solitaria Wesołowska & Tomasiewicz, 2008

Species of spider

Phlegra solitaria is a jumping spider species in the genus Phlegra that lives in Ethiopia. The female was first described in 2008.
