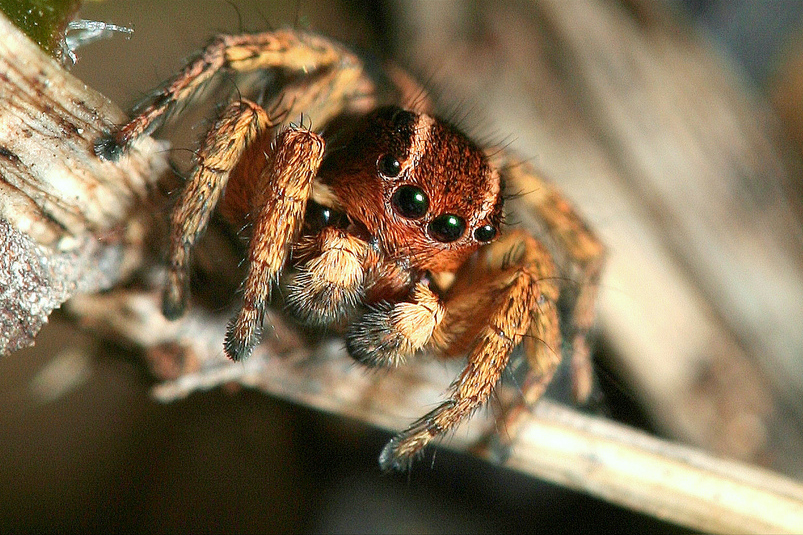
- Phlegra fasciata
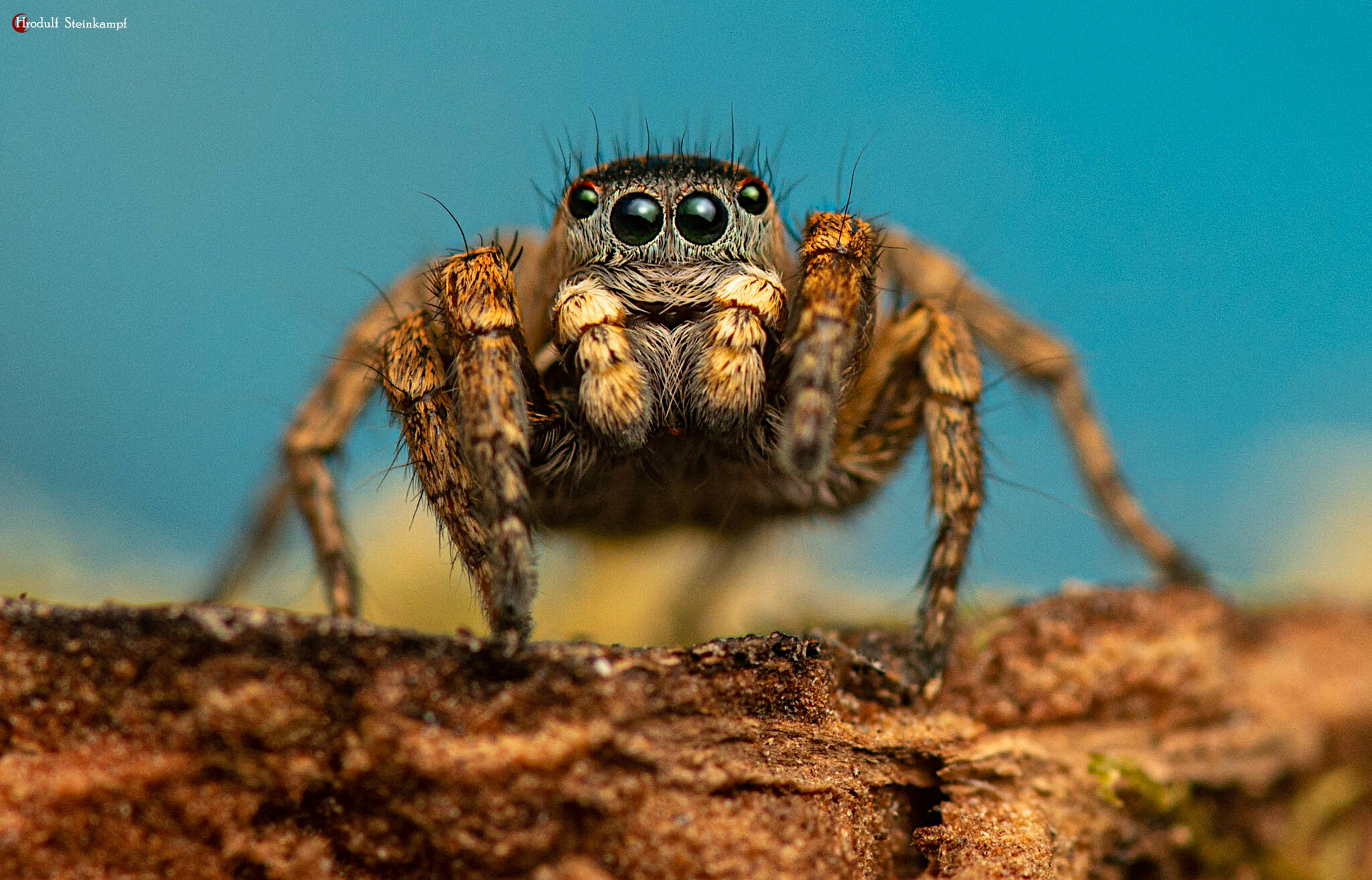
- Phlegra karoo

Scientific classification
- Kingdom: Animalia
- Phylum: Arthropoda
- Subphylum: Chelicerata
- Class: Arachnida
- Order: Araneae
- Infraorder: Araneomorphae
- Family: Salticidae
- Subfamily: Salticinae
- Genus: Phlegra; Simon, 1876

Type species
- P. fasciata (Hahn, 1826)

Species
- 77, see text

= Phlegra (spider) =

Genus of spiders

Phlegra is a genus of jumping spiders that was first described by Eugène Louis Simon in 1876. The name is a reference to a mythical location in both Greek and Roman mythology.

== Distribution ==
Phlegra are found in Eurasia and Africa, with one species (P. hentzi) occurring only in North America.

== Species ==
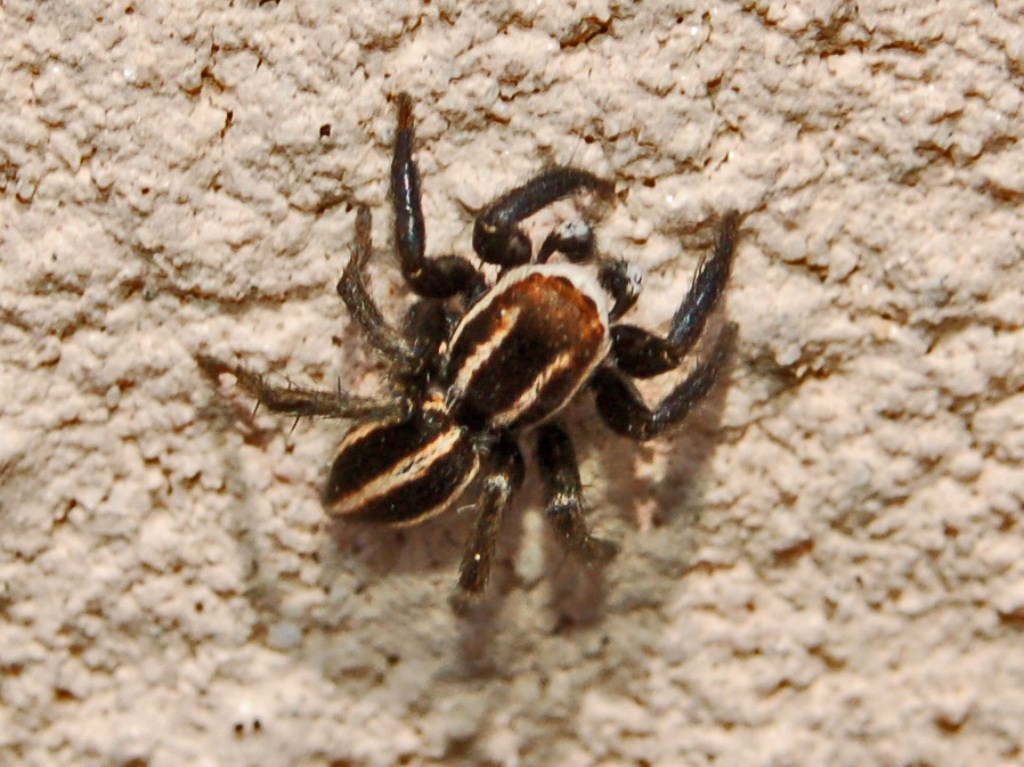
P. bresnieri

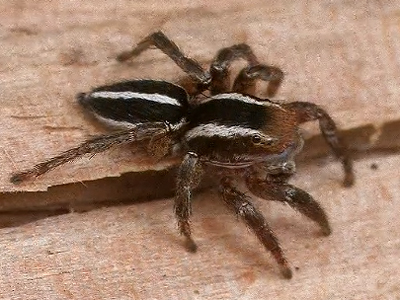
male P. hentzi

male P. fasciata (1846 drawing)

male P. lineata (1846 drawing)

As of October 2025, this genus includes 77 species:

- Phlegra abessinica Strand, 1906 – Ethiopia
- Phlegra abhinandanvarthamani Prajapati, 2019 – India
- Phlegra albostriata Simon, 1901 – South Africa, Lesotho, Mozambique
- Phlegra amitaii Prószyński, 1998 – Israel
- Phlegra andreevae Logunov, 1996 – Central Asia
- Phlegra arborea Wesołowska & Haddad, 2009 – South Africa
- Phlegra atra Wesołowska & Tomasiewicz, 2008 – Ethiopia
- Phlegra bairstowi Simon, 1886 – South Africa
- Phlegra bicognata Azarkina, 2004 – Ukraine, Russia (Europe), Kazakhstan
- Phlegra bifurcata Schmidt & Piepho, 1994 – Cape Verde
- Phlegra blaugrana Azarkina, Pérez-Gómez & Sánchez-García, 2022 – Spain
- Phlegra bresnieri (Lucas, 1846) – Southern Europe, Turkey, Azerbaijan, Iran, Yemen, Northern Africa, Ivory Coast, Tanzania, South Africa
- Phlegra certa Wesołowska & Haddad, 2009 – Mozambique, South Africa
- Phlegra chrysops Simon, 1890 – Yemen
- Phlegra cinereofasciata (Simon, 1868) – Portugal to Central Asia, China
- Phlegra crumena Próchniewicz & Hęciak, 1994 – Kenya
- Phlegra dhakuriensis (Tikader, 1974) – Pakistan, India
- Phlegra dimentmani Prószyński, 1998 – Israel
- Phlegra dunini Azarkina, 2004 – Turkey, Azerbaijan, Iran
- Phlegra etosha Logunov & Azarkina, 2006 – Namibia, South Africa
- Phlegra fasciata (Hahn, 1826) – Europe, Turkey, Caucasus, Russia (Europe to Far East), Kazakhstan, Central Asia, Iran, Afghanistan, India, China, Mongolia, Korea, Japan (type species)
- Phlegra ferberorum Prószyński, 1998 – Israel
- Phlegra flavipes Denis, 1947 – Egypt
- Phlegra fulvastra (Simon, 1868) – Italy (Sicily), Syria, Israel
- Phlegra fulvotrilineata (Lucas, 1846) – Algeria
- Phlegra gagnoa Logunov & Azarkina, 2006 – Ivory Coast
- Phlegra heciakae Wawer & Patoleta, 2025 – Indonesia (Java)
- Phlegra hentzi (Marx, 1890) – Canada, United States
- Phlegra imperiosa G. W. Peckham & E. G. Peckham, 1903 – South Africa
- Phlegra insulana Schmidt & Krause, 1998 – Cape Verde
- Phlegra jacksoni Prószyński, 1998 – Israel
- Phlegra karoo Wesołowska, 2006 – Namibia, Zimbabwe, Mozambique, South Africa
- Phlegra kulczynskii Azarkina, 2004 – Russia (Middle to South Siberia), Kazakhstan, Mongolia
- Phlegra langanoensis Wesołowska & Tomasiewicz, 2008 – Ethiopia, Zimbabwe
- Phlegra levis Próchniewicz & Hęciak, 1994 – Kenya
- Phlegra levyi Prószyński, 1998 – Israel
- Phlegra lineata (C. L. Koch, 1846) – Canary Islands, Southern Europe, Turkey, Syria, Russia (Caucasus)
- Phlegra logunovi Azarkina, 2004 – Kazakhstan, Central Asia
- Phlegra lugubris Berland & Millot, 1941 – Senegal, Guinea, Ivory Coast, Ghana, Nigeria
- Phlegra memorialis (O. Pickard-Cambridge, 1876) – Egypt
- Phlegra micans Simon, 1901 – China (Hong Kong)
- Phlegra nitidiventris (Lucas, 1846) – Portugal, Algeria, Tunisia
- Phlegra nuda Próchniewicz & Hęciak, 1994 – Ethiopia, Uganda, Kenya, Tanzania, Zimbabwe
- Phlegra obscurimagna Azarkina, 2004 – Kyrgyzstan, Kazakhstan
- Phlegra palestinensis Logunov, 1996 – Israel
- Phlegra particeps (O. Pickard-Cambridge, 1872) – Israel to Bhutan
- Phlegra parvula Wesołowska & Russell-Smith, 2000 – Tanzania
- Phlegra pisarskii Żabka, 1985 – China, Vietnam
- Phlegra pori Prószyński, 1998 – Egypt
- Phlegra prasanna Caleb & Mathai, 2015 – India, China
- Phlegra procera Wesołowska & Cumming, 2008 – Zimbabwe
- Phlegra profuga Logunov, 1996 – Central Asia (Russia, Kazakhstan, Kyrgyzstan)
- Phlegra proszynskii Żabka, 2012 – Australia (Lord Howe Is.)
- Phlegra proxima Denis, 1947 – Egypt
- Phlegra pusilla Wesołowska & van Harten, 1994 – Senegal to Zimbabwe, Yemen
- Phlegra rothi Prószyński, 1998 – Israel
- Phlegra samchiensis Prószyński, 1978 – Bhutan
- Phlegra semipullata Simon, 1901 – China (Hong Kong)
- Phlegra shulovi Prószyński, 1998 – Israel
- Phlegra sierrana (Simon, 1868) – Portugal, Spain
- Phlegra simplex Wesołowska & Russell-Smith, 2000 – Tanzania, Zimbabwe
- Phlegra sogdiana Charitonov, 1946 – Kazakhstan, Central Asia
- Phlegra solitaria Wesołowska & Tomasiewicz, 2008 – Ethiopia
- Phlegra soudanica Berland & Millot, 1941 – Mali
- Phlegra stephaniae Prószyński, 1998 – Israel
- Phlegra suaverubens Simon, 1886 – Senegal
- Phlegra swanii Mushtaq, Beg & Waris, 1995 – Pakistan
- Phlegra tenella Wesołowska, 2006 – Namibia
- Phlegra tetralineata (Caporiacco, 1939) – Ethiopia, Iran
- Phlegra theseusi Logunov, 2001 – Greece (Crete)
- Phlegra thibetana Simon, 1901 – Bhutan, China
- Phlegra tillyae Prószyński, 1998 – Israel
- Phlegra touba Logunov & Azarkina, 2006 – Guinea, Ivory Coast, Nigeria, Uganda
- Phlegra tristis Lessert, 1927 – DR Congo, Kenya
- Phlegra v-epigynalis Hęciak & Prószyński, 1998 – Israel, Syria
- Phlegra varia Wesołowska & Russell-Smith, 2000 – Tanzania
- Phlegra yaelae Prószyński, 1998 – Tunisia, Italy (Sicily), Israel, Iran
