= René-Robert Cavelier, Sieur de La Salle =

French explorer of North America (1643–1687)

René-Robert Cavelier
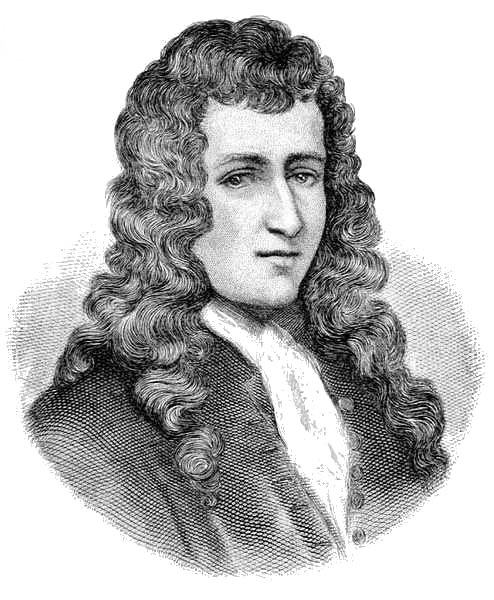
- A 19th-century engraving of Cavelier de La Salle
- Born: November 22, 1643; Rouen, Normandy, Kingdom of France
- Died: March 19, 1687 (aged 43) present-day Huntsville, Texas
- Occupation: explorer
- Known for: exploring the Great Lakes, Mississippi River, and the Gulf of Mexico

René-Robert Cavelier, Sieur de La Salle (/ləˈsæl/, French: [ʁəne ʁɔbɛʁ kavəlje sjœʁ də la sal]; November 22, 1643 – March 19, 1687), was a French explorer and fur trader in North America. He explored the Great Lakes region of the United States and Canada, and the Mississippi River. He is best known for an early 1682 expedition in which he canoed the lower Mississippi River from the mouth of the Illinois River to the Gulf of Mexico; there, on April 9, 1682, he claimed the Mississippi River basin for France after giving it the name La Louisiane, in honor of Saint Louis and Louis XIV. One source states that "he acquired for France the most fertile half of the North American continent". A later, ill-fated expedition in 1684 to the Gulf coast of Mexico (today the U.S. state of Texas) gave the United States a putative claim to Texas in the purchase of the Louisiana Territory from France in 1803; La Salle was assassinated during that expedition.

Although Jolliet and Marquette preceded him on the upper Mississippi in their journey of 1673–74, La Salle extended exploration – and France's claims – all the way to the river's mouth, although the existing historical evidence does not indicate that La Salle ever reached the Ohio/Allegheny Valley.

== Early life ==
Coat of arms of René-Robert Cavelier, Sieur de La Salle

Robert Cavelier was born on November 22, 1643, into a comfortably well-off family in Rouen, France, in the parish Saint-Herbland. His parents were Jean Cavelier and Catherine Geest. His older brother, Jean Cavelier, became a Sulpician priest. When Robert was young, he enjoyed science and nature. In his teens, he studied with the Jesuit religious order and became a member after taking initial vows in 1660. (Note: The Order prohibited a man taking final vows before the age of twenty-five. He was still considered a part of the Order as he was later barred to his inheritance.)

Required to reject his father's legacy when he joined the Jesuits, La Salle was nearly destitute when he traveled as a prospective colonist to North America. He sailed for New France in the spring of 1666. His brother Jean, had moved there the year before. At La Salle's request on March 27, 1667, after he was in Canada, he was released from the Society of Jesus after citing "moral weaknesses".

La Salle was granted a seigneurie on land at the western end of the Island of Montreal, which became known as Lachine. (Note: This was apparently from the French la Chine, for China. The reference is unclear, but may refer to his intent to find a route to the orient.) La Salle immediately began to issue land grants, set up a village and learn the languages of the several tribes of Iroquois in this area.

=== Sieur de La Salle ===
Sieur de La Salle is a French title roughly translating to "Lord of the manor of La Salle." Sieur is a French title of nobility, equivalent to the English word "Lord" (though cognate with the word "Sir"); but under the French seigneurial system (as under the English manorial system), the title is purchased rather than earned and does not imply military obligations. Robert Cavelier took the title with his seigneurial purchase of Lachine from the Sulpician order at Ville Marie around 1667. It refers to the name of a family estate near Rouen. However, La Salle has become closely associated with the person as if it were his name; he is, therefore, often called "Robert La Salle" or simply even "La Salle".

== Expeditions ==
=== "Ohio" expedition ===
The Seneca told La Salle of a great river, called the Ohio, (Note: For this, there is the detailed record of the journey of Casson and Galinee whom La Salle accompanied, from which all historians take their accounts.) which flowed into the sea, the "Vermilion Sea". (Note: What is now called the Gulf of California.) He began to plan for expeditions to find a western passage to China. He sought and received permission from Governor Daniel Courcelle and Intendant Jean Talon to embark on the enterprise. He sold his interests in Lachine to finance the venture.

La Salle left Lachine by the St. Lawrence on July 6, 1669, with a flotilla of nine canoes and 24 men, an unknown number of Seneca guides: himself and 14 hired men in four canoes, the two Sulpicians Dollier de Casson and Abbé René de Bréhan de Galinée with seven new recruits in three canoes, and two canoes of Natives. Having travelled up the St. Lawrence and across Lake Ontario for 35 days, they arrived at what is called today Irondequoit Bay on the southern shore of Lake Ontario at the mouth of Irondequoit Creek, a place now commemorated as La Salle's Landing.

There they were greeted by a party of Natives, who escorted them starting the next day to a village some leagues distant, a journey of a few days. At the village, the Seneca vehemently attempted to dissuade the party from proceeding into the lands of their enemies, the Algonquins, telling of the dire fate awaiting them. The necessity of securing guides for the further part of the journey, and the refusal of the Seneca to provide them, delayed the expedition a month. A fortuitous capture by the Natives in the lands to the south of a Dutchman who spoke Iroquois well but French poorly, and was to be burned at the stake for transgressions unknown, provided an opportunity to obtain a guide. The Dutchman's freedom was purchased by the party in exchange for wampum.

While at the Native village in September 1669, La Salle was seized with a violent fever (Note: According to Parkman, it may have been caused by the sight of three rattlesnakes on a rock he was ascending.) and expressed the intention of returning to Ville Marie.

At this juncture, he parted from his company and the narrative of the Jesuits, who continued on to upper Lake Erie. Other accounts have it that some of La Salle's men soon returned to New Holland or Ville Marie.

==== Further evidence ====
Beyond that, the factual record of La Salle's first expedition ends, and what prevails is obscurity and fabrication. It is likely that he spent the winter in Ville Marie. The next confirmed sighting of La Salle was by Nicolas Perrot on the Ottawa River near the Rapide des Chats in early summer, 1670, hunting with a party of Iroquois. That would be 700 miles as the crow flies from the Falls of the Ohio, the point supposed by some that he reached on the Ohio River. (Note: It is purported by some that he journeyed via a stream passing six or seven leagues south of lake Erie, which was a tributary of the Ohio, to that river, thence downstream so far as the Falls of the Ohio below the site of the modern city of Louisville, where his crew abandoned him, and he returned to Canada on his own.)

La Salle's own journal of the expedition was lost in 1756. Two indirect historical accounts exist. The one, Récit d'un ami de l'abbé de Galliné, purported to be a recitation by La Salle himself to an unknown writer during his visit to Paris in 1678, and the other Mémoire sur le projet du sieur de la Salle pour la descouverte de la partie occidentale de l'Amérique septentrionale entre la Nouvelle-France, la Floride et le Mexique. A letter from Madeleine Cavelier, his now elderly niece, written in 1746, commenting on the journal of La Salle in her possession may also shed some light on the issue.

La Salle himself never claimed to have discovered the Ohio River. In a letter to the intendant Talon in 1677, he claimed "discovery" of a river, the Baudrane, flowing southwesterly below the Great Lakes (well north of the Ohio's location) with its head on Lake Erie and emptying into the Saint Louis (i.e. the Mississippi), a hydrography which was non-existent. In those days, maps as well as descriptions were based part on observation and part on hearsay, of necessity. This confounded courses, mouths and confluences among the rivers. At various times, La Salle invented such rivers as the Chucagoa, Baudrane, Louisiane (anglicized as "Saint Louis"), and Ouabanchi-Aramoni.

Confounding fact with fiction started with publication in 1876 of Pierre Margry's Découvertes et Établissements des Français. Margry was a French archivist and partisan who had private access to the French archives. He came to be the agent of American historian Francis Parkman. Margry's work, a massive nine volumes, encompassed an assemblage of documents – some previously published, but many not. In it, he sometimes published a reproduction of the whole document, and sometimes only an extract, or summary, not distinguishing the one from the other. These discrepancies have significantly complicated efforts to retrace and build upon Margry's work.

He also used in some cases one or another copies of original documents previously edited, extracted or altered by others, without specifying which transcriptions were original, and which were copies, or whether the copy was dated earlier or later. Reproductions were scattered in fragments across chapters, so that it was impossible to ascertain the integrity of the document from its fragments. Chapter headings were oblique and sensational, so as to obfuscate the content therein. English and American scholars were immediately skeptical of the work, since full and faithful publication of some of the original documents had previously existed. The situation was so fraught with doubt, that the United States Congress appropriated $10,000 in 1873, which Margry wanted as an advance, to have the original documents photostated and witnessed by uninvolved parties as to veracity.

=== Fort Frontenac and the fur trade ===
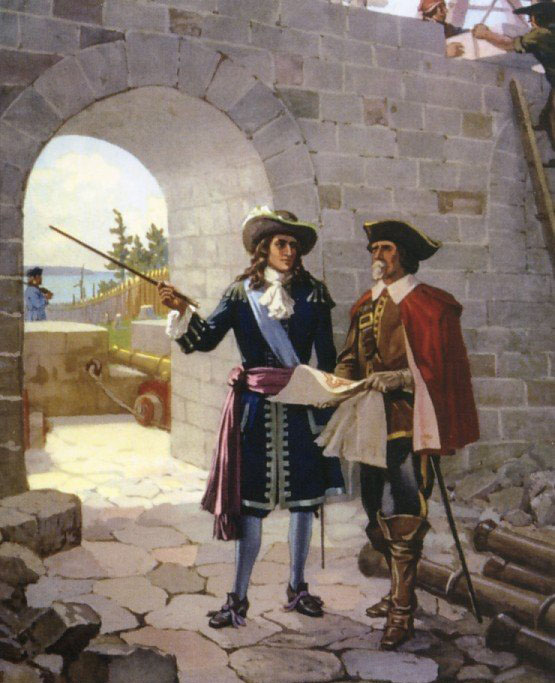
Depiction of La Salle inspecting the reconstruction of Fort Frontenac, 1675. Painting by John David Kelly.

La Salle undertook several other smaller unknown expeditions between 1671 and 1673. On July 12, 1673, the Governor of New France, Louis de Buade de Frontenac, arrived at the mouth of the Cataraqui River to meet with leaders of the Five Nations of the Iroquois to encourage them to trade with the French. While the groups met and exchanged gifts, Frontenac's men, led by La Salle, hastily constructed a rough wooden palisade on a point of land by a shallow, sheltered bay. Originally the fort was named Fort Cataraqui; it was later renamed Fort Frontenac by La Salle, in honor of his patron. The purpose of Fort Frontenac was to control the lucrative fur trade in the Great Lakes Basin to the west. The fort was also meant to be a bulwark against the English and Dutch, who were competing with the French for control of the fur trade. La Salle was left in command of the fort in 1673.

Thanks to his powerful protector, the discoverer managed, during a voyage to France in 1674–75, to secure for himself the grant of Fort Cataraqui and acquired letters of nobility for himself and his descendants. With Frontenac's support, he received not only a fur trade concession, with permission to establish frontier forts, but also a title of nobility. He returned and rebuilt Frontenac in stone. An Ontario Heritage Trust plaque describes La Salle at Cataraqui as "[a] major figure in the expansion of the French fur trade into the Lake Ontario region. Using the fort as a base, he undertook expeditions to the west and southwest in the interest of developing a vast fur-trading empire."

=== Great Lakes forts ===
After leaving Lower Canada in September 1678, La Salle and his lieutenant Henri de Tonti travelled to Fort Frontenac (now in Kingston, Ontario) and then to Niagara where, in December 1678, they were the first Europeans documented to have seen Niagara Falls; they built Fort Conti at the mouth of the Niagara River. There, they loaded supplies into smaller boats (canoes or bateaux), so they could continue up the shallow and swiftly flowing lower Niagara River to what is now the location of Lewiston, New York. There the Iroquois had a well-established portage route that bypassed the rapids and the cataract later known as Niagara Falls.

The first ship built by La Salle, called the Frontenac, was a 10-ton single-decked brigantine or barque; it was lost in Lake Ontario on January 8, 1679. Afterward, La Salle built Le Griffon, a seven-cannon, 45-ton barque, on the upper Niagara River, at or near Cayuga Creek; she was launched on August 7, 1679. La Salle sailed in Le Griffon up Lake Erie to Lake Huron, then up Huron to Michilimackinac and on to present-day Green Bay, Wisconsin. Le Griffon then left for Niagara with a load of furs, but was never seen again.

La Salle continued with his men in canoes down the western shore of Lake Michigan, rounding the southern end to the mouth of the Miami River (now St. Joseph River), where they built a stockade in November 1679. They called it Fort Miami (now known as St. Joseph, Michigan). There they waited for Tonti and his party, who had crossed the Lower Michigan peninsula on foot.

On December 3, 1679, with a group of 40, La Salle and Henri de Tonti headed south from Fort Miami. They canoed up the St. Joseph and followed it to a portage at present-day South Bend, Indiana. They crossed to the Kankakee River and followed it to the Illinois River. In January 1680, they reached an area that is near the current city of Peoria, Illinois. In order to help the local Peoria tribe defend themselves against the Iroquois, La Salle and his group built a stockade and named it Fort Crèvecoeur.

In March 1680, La Salle set off on foot for Fort Frontenac for supplies. There, he discovered that only a month after his departure, the soldiers at Ft. Crevecoeur, led by Martin Chartier, mutinied, destroyed the fort, and exiled Tonti, whom he had left in charge.

=== Mississippi expedition ===
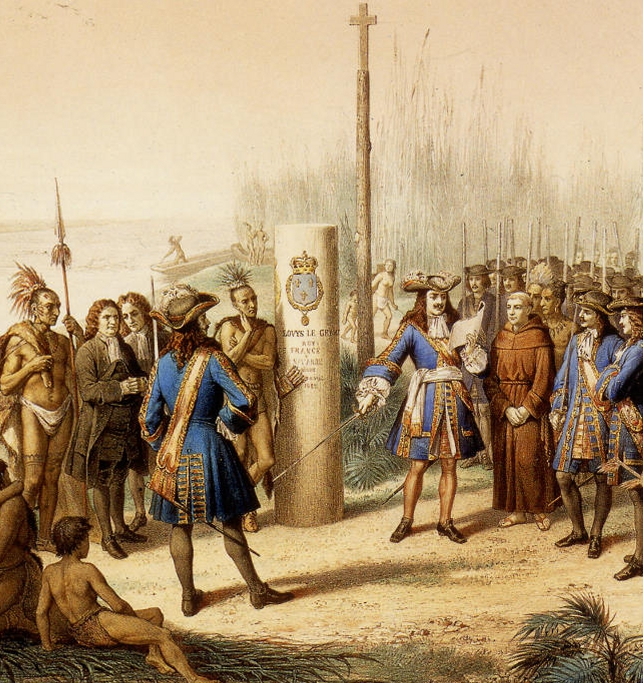
Color reproduction of Taking possession of Louisiana and the River Mississippi, in the name of Louis XIVth by Jean-Adolphe Bocquin

The group later travelled along the Illinois River and arrived at the Mississippi River in February 1682; they built canoes there. The exploration reached an area that is now Memphis, Tennessee, where La Salle built a small fort, named Fort Prudhomme.

In April 1682, the expedition reached the Gulf of Mexico. There, La Salle named the Mississippi basin La Louisiane in honor of Louis XIV and claimed it for France.

During 1682–83, La Salle, with Henry de Tonti, established Fort Saint-Louis of Illinois at Starved Rock on the Illinois River to protect and hold the region for France. La Salle then returned to Montreal and later, to France.

=== Texas expedition and death ===
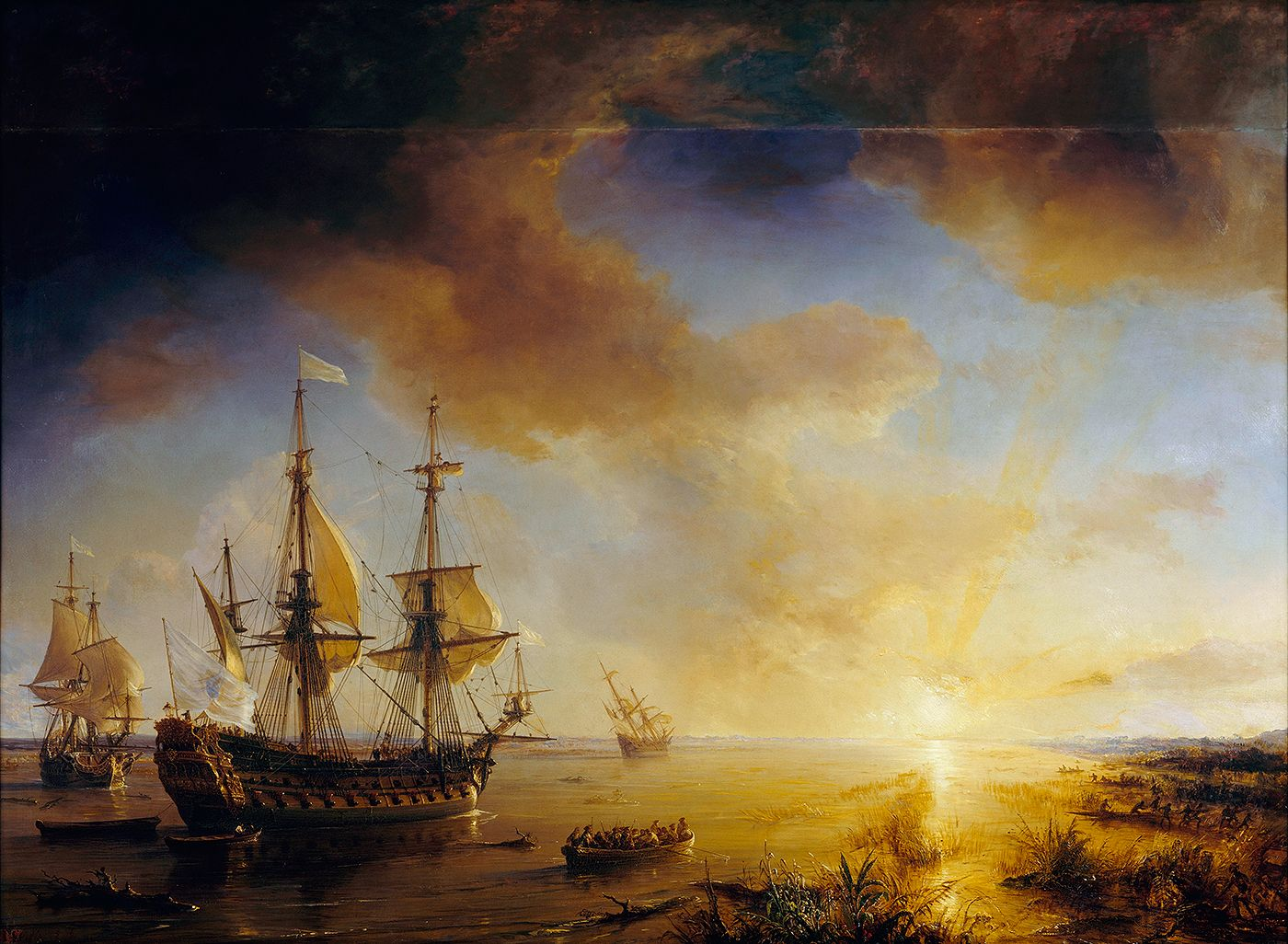
Painting by Theodore Gudin titled La Salle's Expedition to Louisiana in 1684. The ship on the left is La Belle, in the middle is Le Joly, and L'Aimable is to the right. They are at the entrance to Matagorda Bay.

On July 24, 1684, he departed France and returned to America with a large expedition designed to establish a French colony on the Gulf of Mexico, at the mouth of the Mississippi River. They had four ships and 300 colonists. The expedition was plagued by pirates, Natives defending their land, and poor navigation. One ship was lost to pirates in the West Indies, a second sank in the inlets of Matagorda Bay. The La Belle made landfall in February 1685.

They founded a settlement, near the bay which they called the Bay of Saint Louis, on Garcitas Creek in the vicinity of present-day Victoria, Texas. La Salle led a group eastward on foot on three occasions to try to locate the mouth of the Mississippi. In the meantime, the flagship La Belle, the only remaining ship, ran aground and sank into the mud, stranding the colony on the Texas coast.

Some of his men mutinied, near the site of present-day Navasota, Texas. (Note: There is some disagreement about accepting Navasota as the site of La Salle's death. Historian Robert Weddle, for example, believes that his travel distances were miscalculated, and that he was murdered just east of the Trinity River.)

On March 19, 1687, La Salle was slain by Pierre Duhaut during an ambush while talking to Duhaut's decoy, Jean L'Archevêque. They were "six leagues" from the westernmost village of the Hasinai (Tejas) Indians. One source states that Duhaut was a "disenchanted follower". Duhaut was shot and killed by James Hiems to avenge La Salle. Over the following week, others were killed; confusion followed as to who killed whom.

The colony lasted only until 1688, when Karankawa-speaking Natives killed the 20 remaining adults and took five children as captives. Tonti sent a search mission in 1689 when he learned of the colonizers' fate, but the expedition ran out of supplies in northern Texas and failed to reach the site.

It is now known that there were 15 survivors of the original 180 colonists at the fort, most of whom had accompanied La Salle on his final eastward trek to locate the mouth of the Colbert (Mississippi) River and escaped the massacre: five children kidnapped by Native Americans at the settlement and later rescued by the Spanish, and 10 other adults, who lived for a while among the Native Americans and were later captured and released by the Spanish. Six found their way to Canada and eventually returned to France. Three others were refused passage by the Spanish; an Italian was imprisoned. For as long as 30 years after the demise of the colony, there were specious accounts of survivors still living among the Native Americans in Texas.

== Personal life ==
La Salle never married, but has been linked to Madeleine de Roybon d'Allonne, an early colonizer of New France.

== Legacy ==
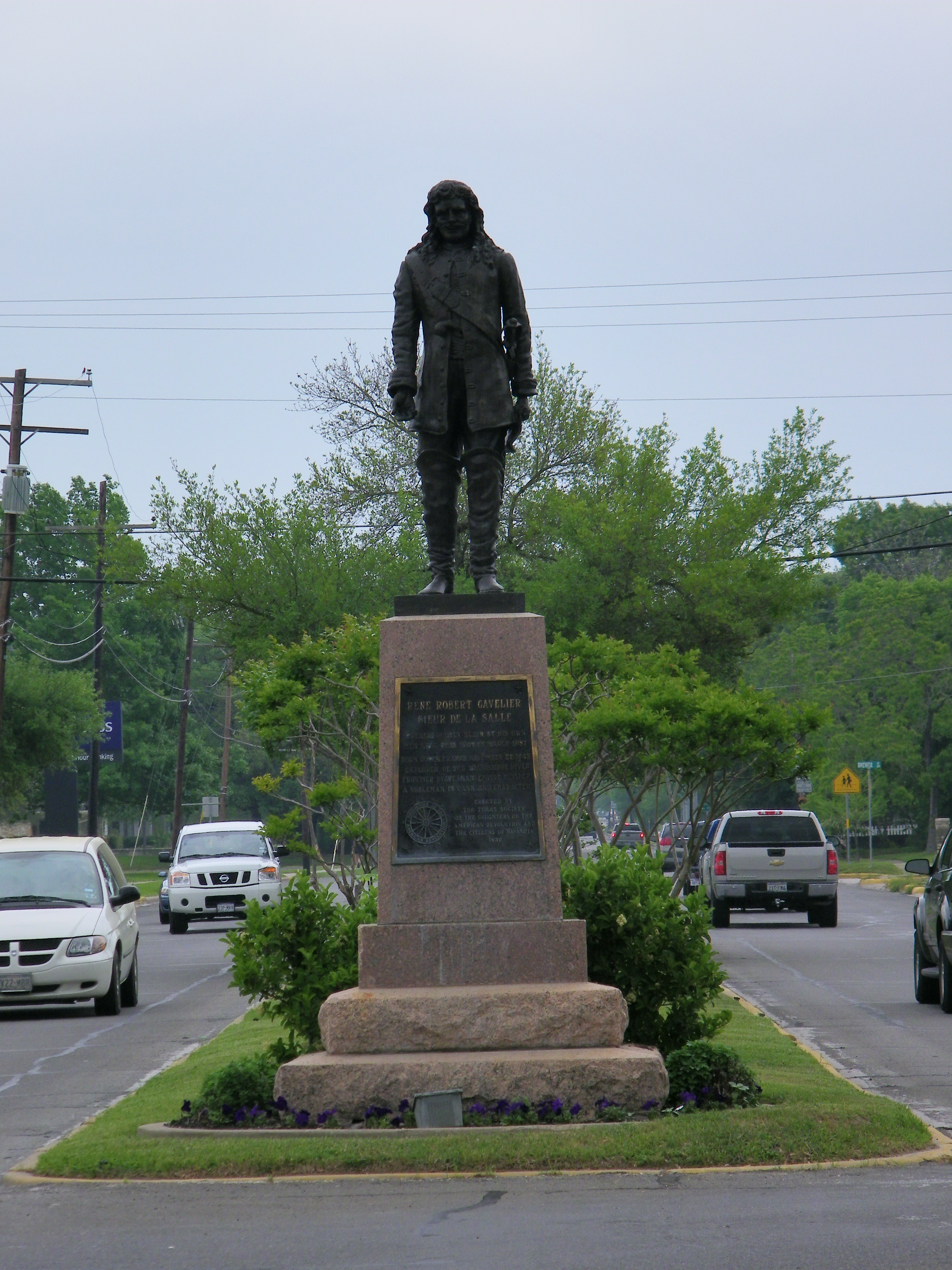
Statue of de La Salle located in Navasota, Texas

Statue of La Salle in Lincoln Park, Chicago, as seen in the January 1919 issue of National Geographic magazine

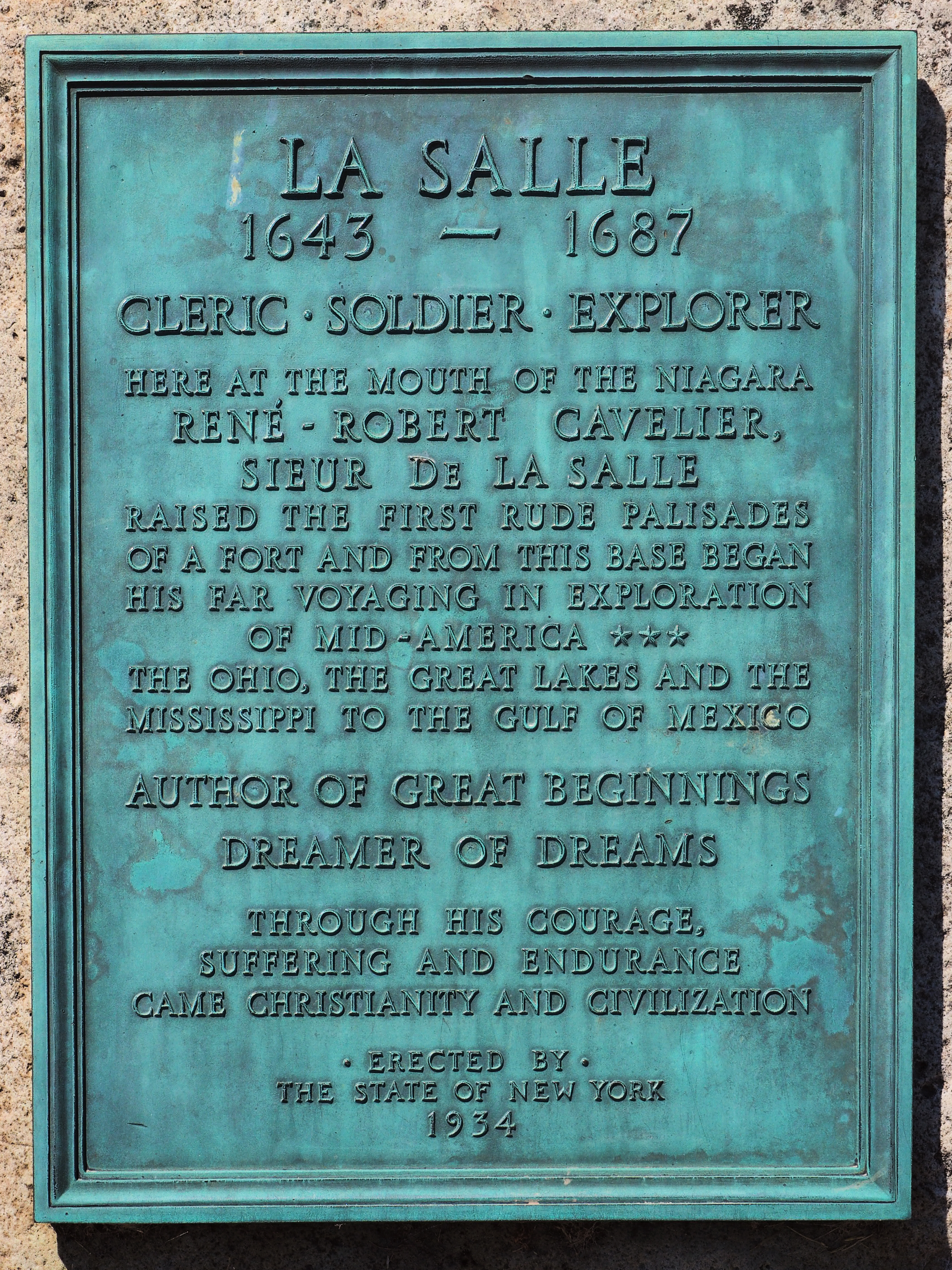
Bronze plaque honoring LA SALLE, at Old Fort Niagara, New York

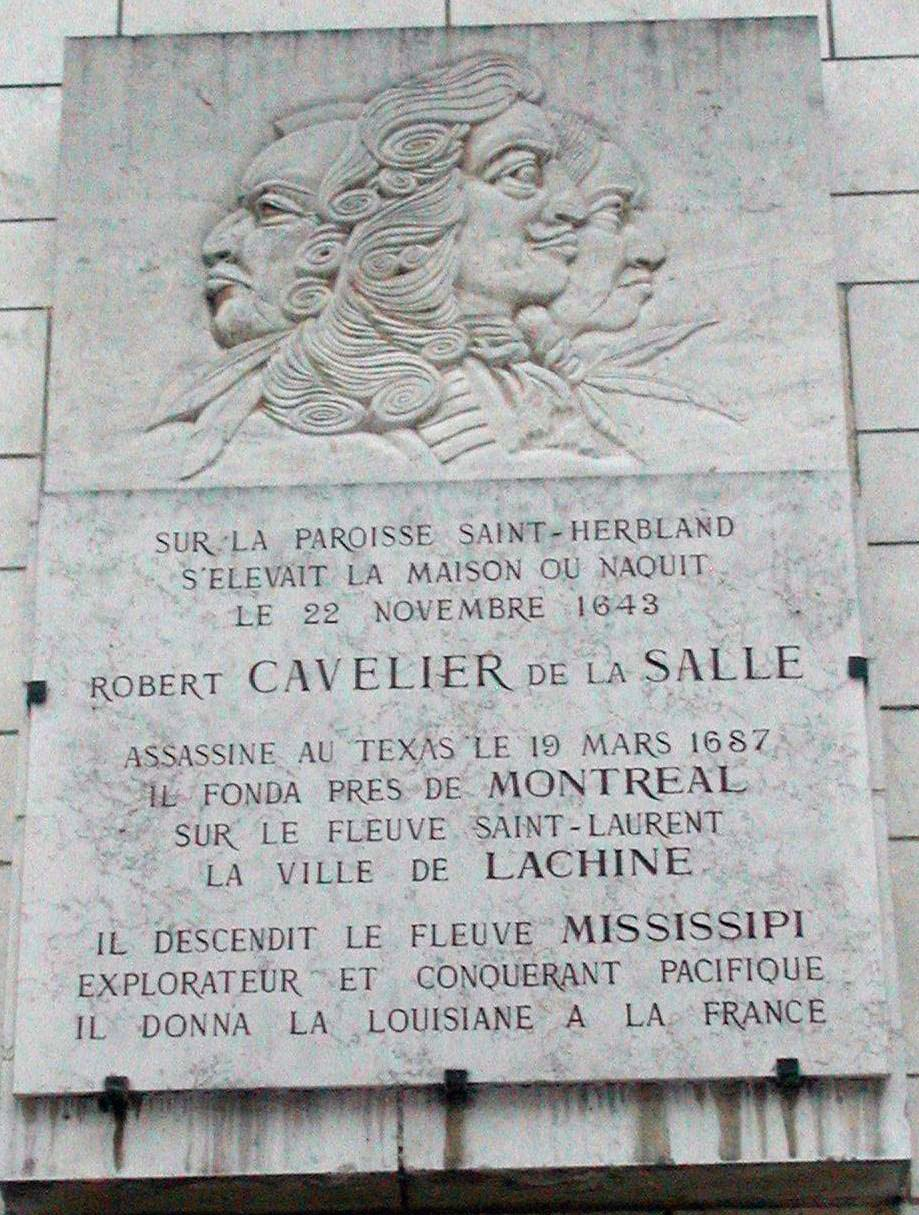
Memorial Plaque to de La Salle in Rouen

In addition to the forts, which also served as authorized agencies for the extensive fur trade, La Salle's visits to Illinois and other Natives cemented the French policy of alliance with Natives in the common causes of containing both Iroquois influence and Anglo-American colonization. He also gave the name Louisiana (La Louisiane) to the interior North American territory he claimed for France, which lives on in the name of a U.S. state.

The Encyclopædia Britannica provides this summary of La Salle's achievements: "His claim of Louisiana for France, though but a vain boast at the time, pointed the way to the French colonial empire that was eventually built by other men".

Pierre Berton wrote, "no other man had crammed so much adventure, so much excitement, so many triumphs, and so many heartbreaks into a single career. Though he died at the hands of some of his quarrelling followers in the mud of reeds of the Gulf of Mexico lowlands, he was essentially a man of the lakes, of Ontario and Erie, Huron and Michigan...."

A sculpture of de La Salle is located on the south facade of the Knute Rockne Memorial on the campus of the University of Notre Dame. There is also a statue of him in Chicago's Lincoln Park.

=== La Salle Explorers ===
La Salle University in Philadelphia, Pennsylvania, adopted the nickname "Explorers" for its athletic teams after René-Robert Cavelier, Sieur de La Salle. La Salle University is named after Saint Jean-Baptiste de La Salle, the French priest, educator and founder of the Institute of the Brothers of the Christian Schools. In 1931, a sportswriter mistakenly referred to the La Salle football team as the "Explorers" thinking the school was named after the French explorer. In 1932 students voted to pick "Explorers" as the official nickname. The La Salle University mascot is The Explorer.

== Archaeology ==
In 1995, La Salle's primary ship La Belle was discovered in the muck of Matagorda Bay. It has been the subject of archeological research. A search of the wreck and surrounding area during 1996 to 1997 yielded numerous artifacts from the 17th century. Through an international treaty, the artifacts excavated from La Belle are owned by France and held in trust by the Texas Historical Commission. The collection is held by the Corpus Christi Museum of Science and History. Artifacts from La Belle are shown at nine museums across Texas.

The wreckage of his ship L'Aimable has yet to be located. In 1998, The National Underwater and Marine Agency claimed that it had found the wreck in Matagorda Bay but the Texas Historical Commission stated that the wreck was much more recent.

The possible remains of Le Griffon were found in 1898 by lighthouse keeper Albert Cullis, on a beach on the western edge of Manitoulin Island in northern Lake Huron. Results of testing some of the artifacts were disputed. Many of the recovered artifacts were lost and the wreck was washed away in 1942. A possible shipwreck of Le Griffon near Poverty Island at the entrance to Green Bay in northern Lake Michigan was located by Steve Libert of the Great Lakes Exploration Group in 2001. The organization prevailed in a lawsuit against the state of Michigan over ownership of artifacts in 2012, and in 2013 was issued a permit to excavate the wreck. Only one artifact, a wood pole, was recovered, and it is indeterminate whether it was from a shipwreck. In 2019, the Discovery Channel featured the story of the ship; divers who were involved in the investigation were convinced that Le Griffon sank in the Mississagi Strait.

Historians debated the site of La Salle's "Fort St Louis" colony, which had been said to be near Lavaca Bay at Garcitas Creek, and was a significant part of the history of French colonization of Texas. A June 1996 dig at the site that was believed to be the correct location revealed eight French cannon. This led archeologists to excavate the Keeran Ranch site in the area, during 1996–2002; they concluded that the Spanish Presidio La Bahía fort "was built on the La Salle settlement". Some 10 percent of the artifacts recovered are believed to have originated in France.

== Place names ==
Many places, streets, parks, buildings and other things were named in La Salle's honor:

Counties and towns

- LaSalle, in Essex County, Ontario, south of Windsor on the Detroit River
- LaSalle, Quebec is a borough of the city of Montreal, Quebec, Canada.
- LaSalle County, Illinois, the city of LaSalle and the LaSalle Speedway within it.
- LaSalle Parish, Louisiana
- La Salle County, Texas
- La Salle, Minnesota

Parks and streets

- The LaSalle Expressway, a roadway through Niagara Falls, New York and its outer suburbs.
- LaSalle Street, a north–south thoroughfare in Chicago, leads directly to the Board of Trade, and is the center of Chicago's financial district.
- La Salle Street, official name for the westernmost portion of West 124th Street, running between Claremont Avenue and Amsterdam Avenue, Upper Manhattan, New York City.
- The La Salle Causeway, connecting Kingston, Ontario to neighbouring Barriefield, Ontario.
- Jardin Cavelier de La Salle in the 6ème arrondissement in Paris
- La Salle Avenue, a downtown street in Minneapolis, Minnesota.
- Avenue La Salle, located in Shawinigan, Quebec, Canada.
- La Salle Street in Navasota, Texas. It also contains a statue given by the local Robert Raines Chapter of the National Society Daughters of the American Revolution and the Texas Society Daughters of the American Revolution.
- Lasalle Road, an east–west road to the south of Sarnia, Ontario, Canada.
- LaSalle Avenue, a thoroughfare in South Bend, Indiana, which traverses the downtown area and carries a portion of U.S. Route 20 Business.
- LaSalle Boulevard and Cavelier Road in Marquette Heights, Illinois, near Fort Crèvecoeur
- La Salle Avenue in Waco, Texas.
- La Salles Landing Park on Irondequoit Creek in Penfield, NY
- La Salle Park in Burlington, Ontario
- Robert LaSalle County Park, Door County, Wisconsin.

Buildings and other

- LaSalle automobile brand
- LaSalle-Peru Township High School in LaSalle, Illinois has the mascot of the Cavaliers (Cavs) and Lady Cavaliers (Lady Cavs).
- La Salle Hotel, Chicago
- LaSalle Hotel in downtown Bryan, Texas
- École secondaire publique De La Salle in Ottawa, Ontario
- La Salle Secondary School in Kingston, Ontario
- De La Salle High School in New Orleans, Louisiana
