= Montargis =

- Subprefecture and commune
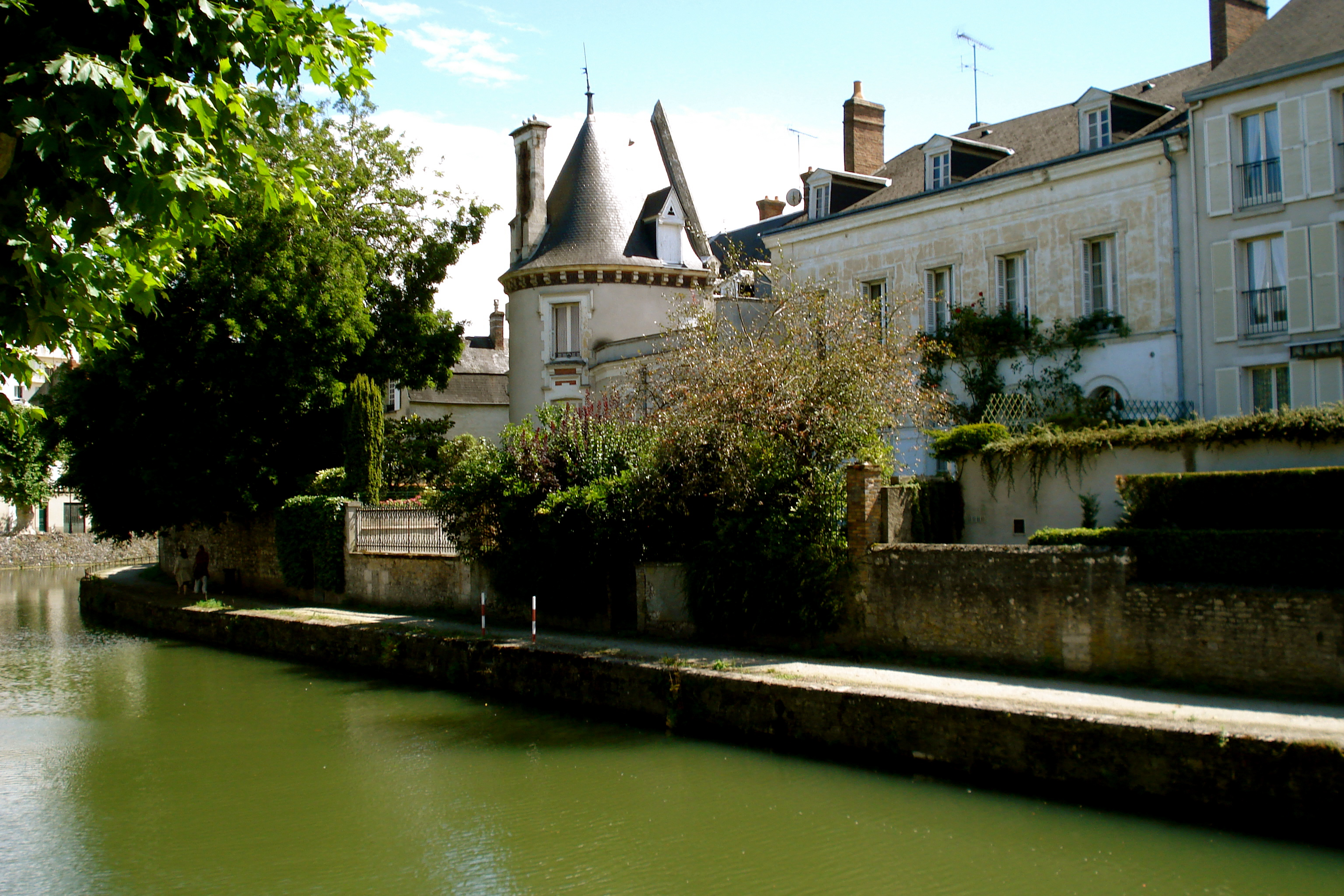
- The Briare Canal in Montargis

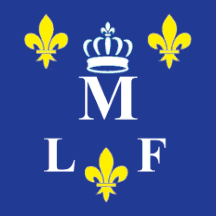
- Flag Coat of arms
- Location of Montargis
- Location within France Location within Centre-Val de Loire
- Coordinates: 47°59′52″N 2°44′00″E
- Country: France
- Region: Centre-Val de Loire
- Department: Loiret
- Arrondissement: Montargis
- Canton: Montargis
- Intercommunality: CA Montargoise et Rives du Loing

Government
  - Mayor (2026–2032): Dominique Coquelle (RN)
- Area^{1}: 4.46 km^{2} (1.72 sq mi)
- Elevation: 85 m (279 ft)
- Highest elevation: 112 m (367 ft)
- Lowest elevation: 82 m (269 ft)
- Population (2023): 14,825
  - Density: 3,320/km^{2} (8,610/sq mi)
- Demonym(s): Montargois, Montargoise
- Time zone: UTC+01:00 (CET)
  - Summer (DST): UTC+02:00 (CEST)
- INSEE/Postal code: 45208 /45200
- ^{1} French Land Register data, which excludes lakes, ponds, glaciers > 1 km^{2} (0.386 sq mi or 247 acres) and river estuaries.

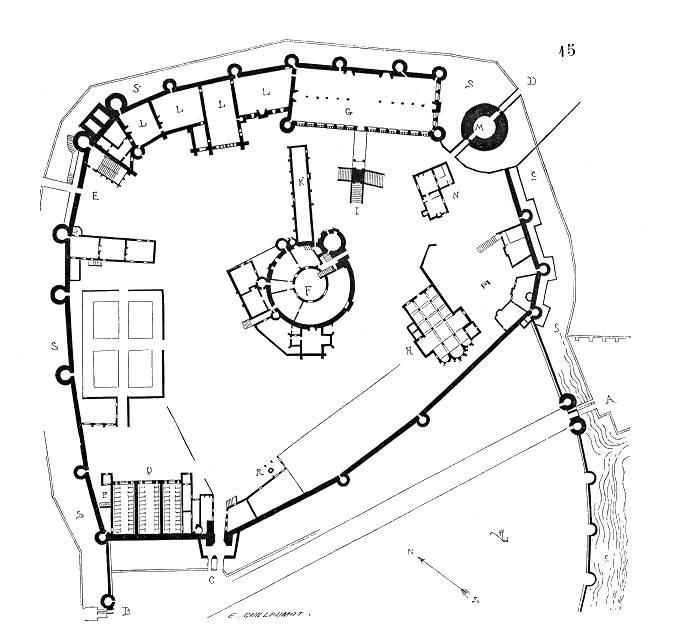
Floorplan of the Château de Montargis

Montargis (French pronunciation: [mɔ̃taʁʒi]) is a commune and city, and the sub-prefecture of the department of Loiret, located in the region of Centre-Val de Loire, France.

It is near a large forest, and contains light industry and farming, including saffron. Due to its numerous canals and bridges, Montargis sometimes bills itself as the "Venice of the Gâtinais." Though quite modern, it retains a medieval charm in its downtown area.

== Geography ==
Montargis lies on both banks of the river Loing and the Briare Canal, in the Gâtinais region. The town is about 110 km (68 mi) south of Paris and 70 km (43 mi) east of Orléans. Montargis station has rail connections to Nevers, Melun and Paris. The A77 autoroute (Montargis–Nevers) passes west of the town.

== History ==
Though the town is known to date to ancient times, during the Renaissance, fanciful etymologies were invented to account for the place name Montargis, whether as mons argi, Mount of Argus, the place where the jealous goddess Juno charged Argus Panoptes with guarding her rival Io, or connected with the chieftain Moritas mentioned by Julius Caesar, in his Gallic Wars.

=== Origins and Middle Ages ===
Numerous Gallo-Roman artifacts have been found in the area and many are in the town's Gâtinais Museum.

Later the town was a stronghold of the Frankish king Clovis I.

Montargis was originally a seat of the house of Courtenay, which fortified a château on a hill overlooking the town. The town was ceded to the king of France in 1188. Eleanor Plantagenet, second daughter of King John of England and wife of Simon de Montfort, 6th Earl of Leicester (killed at the Battle of Evesham), died here on 13 April 1275. In the 14th and 15th centuries it was a royal residence.

=== Hundred Years' War ===
In 1427, during the Hundred Years' War, the Earl of Warwick besieged the town with artillery, beginning bombardment on 15 July. During the siege the residents of Montargis sabotaged the dikes of numerous ponds in the district, causing flooding and drowning many of the besieging Plantagenets. On 5 September a French force of 1600 men led by Jean de Dunois and La Hire, commanders who would go on to lead the army of Joan of Arc, broke the siege. It was the first important victory by the army of King Charles VII in the war, gratefully remembered by Charles later.

After being wounded in an unsuccessful attempt to besiege Paris in September 1429, Joan of Arc passed through Montargis on her way to Gien.

After the war Charles VII rewarded the town for its valour by granting it various privileges. In 1490 Charles VIII officially declared the town Montargis-le-Franc (pronounced [mɔ̃taʁʒi lə fʁɑ̃]; "Montargis the tax-free"). This title is abbreviated to MLF in the official coat of arms (seen in the seal shown here). This privilege was renewed by his successors and Montargis remained free of taxes for three centuries until it was revoked during the French Revolution.

=== Legend of the Dog of Montargis ===
The best-known legend of Montargis is that of the "Dog of Montargis." In the story, Aubry de Montdidier, a courtier of King Charles V of France, was murdered around 1400 in a forest near Montargis by Robert Macaire, an envious knight. After his death, Mondidier's dog showed a remarkable hostility to Macaire. King Charles decreed a trial by combat in the town between the dog and Macaire, who was armed with only a cudgel. After the dog won the battle, Macaire confessed to the crime and was hanged. A dramatic bronze statue of this fight is in the courtyard of the Girodet Museum in central Montargis, and the contest is depicted in a stained glass window in a local church as well. The story was the subject of a 19th-century melodrama, The Dog of Montarges (French: Le Chien de Montargis, ou la Forêt de Bondy), that held the stage for years in Paris and was performed in English and German translations.

=== Sixteenth century ===
In 1528 King Francis I granted the town to his sister-in-law, Renée of France, Duchess of Ferrara and daughter of King Louis XII. After her husband, Ercole II d'Este, the Duke of Ferrara, died in 1559, Renée resided at Montargis. She sheltered there Protestant Huguenots fleeing from persecutions in Paris and elsewhere during the 16th century French Wars of Religion.

=== Industrial development ===
In the 1880s, Hutchinson SA built a rubber factory in Châlette-sur-Loing near Montargis. It today employs 2000 workers to produce tires and parts for vehicles and appliances.

=== Chinese connections ===
Montargis was a hub of Chinese expatriate political activity in the 1910s and early 1920s. A significant share of participants in the Diligent Work-Frugal Study Movement (French: mouvement travail-études) stayed there. The most famous of them, Deng Xiaoping, was a worker producing rubber galoshes in the Hutchinson factory of Châlette-sur-Loing for eight months from mid-February to mid-October 1922.

This history became a matter for commemoration a century later. In 2014 the square in front of Montargis railway station was renamed in honour of Deng Xiaoping. In 2016 the Hunan provincial government opened the Historical Museum of French-Chinese Friendship in an old house in the town centre. On 4 May 2019, for the 100th anniversary of China's May Fourth Movement, a bronze memorial to the Work-Study Movement by Chinese sculptor Wu Weishan was inaugurated in front of the railway station.

=== Riots ===
In 2023, riots following the death of Nahel Merzouk caused extensive damage in the city centre, including burning buildings and looted shops. The damage is estimated to be worth millions of euros.

== Sport ==
Stage 2 of The 2024 Paris–Nice Cycle Race finished at Montargis, March 3, 2024.

== Population ==
Historical population
Year	Pop.	±% p.a.
1968	18,225	—
1975	18,380	+0.12%
1982	16,110	−1.87%
1990	15,020	−0.87%
1999	15,030	+0.01%
2007	15,755	+0.59%
2012	14,490	−1.66%
2017	14,643	+0.21%
2023	14,825	+0.21%
Source: INSEE

== Culture ==
Pralines, the crunchy confection made from almonds and caramelised sugar, were first made in Montargis during the reign of Louis XIII. The original shop is still in business on Place Mirabeau.

Baron Palamède de Charlus relates among his many other blandishments that he is the “Damoiseau de Montargis” in Marcel Proust's À la recherche du temps perdu.

On 4 July 2006 residents of Montargis competed in and won the Intervilles game show against opponent town Moulins.

The Musée Girodet and Château de Montargis are among the town's main sights.

== Notable people ==
- Eleanor of Leicester lived in exile as a nun at the abbey in Montargis and died there in 1275.
- Denis Jamet died there in 1625.
- Jeanne-Marie Bouvier de la Motte-Guyon was born there in 1648.
- Anne-Louis Girodet de Roussy-Trioson was born there in 1767 and the town's art gallery is named after him.
- Charles-Etienne Gudin (1768–1812), French general during the French Revolutionary Wars and Napoleonic Wars
- Madeleine de Roybon d'Allonne (1646–1718), early settler of New France
- Louis-Jacques Bresnier (1814–1869), 19th-century orientalist, was born in Montargis.
- Deng Xiaoping and Zhou Enlai lived in the town's Chinese community in the 1920s.
- Patricia Petibon was born here in 1970.
- Louis Pierre Manuel (1751 – 17 November 1793), a French writer and political figure of the Revolution
- Françoise Delord (1940–2021), zookeeper
- David Le Frapper a French professional football coach and a former defensive midfielder was born in Montargis.

== Twin towns ==
Montargis is twinned with:

- Greven, Germany
- Crowborough, United Kingdom
