= Phlegra cinereofasciata =

Scientific classification
- Kingdom: Animalia
- Phylum: Arthropoda
- Subphylum: Chelicerata
- Class: Arachnida
- Order: Araneae
- Infraorder: Araneomorphae
- Family: Salticidae
- Genus: Phlegra
- Species: P. cinereofasciata

Binomial name
- Phlegra cinereofasciata Kulczynski, 1891

Synonyms
- Phlegra fuscipes

Species of spider

Phlegra cinereofasciata is a species of jumping spiders that can be found in Siberia and China. It was described by Kulczyński in 1891.

== Description ==
The spider has four eyes, and is brownish-gray coloured.
