= Phlegra simplex =

Scientific classification
- Kingdom: Animalia
- Phylum: Arthropoda
- Subphylum: Chelicerata
- Class: Arachnida
- Order: Araneae
- Infraorder: Araneomorphae
- Family: Salticidae
- Genus: Phlegra
- Species: P. simplex

Binomial name
- Phlegra simplex Wesołowska & Russell-Smith, 2000

Species of spider

Phlegra simplex is a jumping spider species in the genus Phlegra that lives in Tanzania and Zimbabwe. The male was first described in 2000.
