= Madeleine de Roybon d'Allonne =

Madeleine de Roybon d'Allonne (1646, Montargis, Orléanais – 17 January 1718, Montréal) was an early settler of New France. She was the first European woman to own land in Ontario. There is a memorial plaque in her honour located in Lennox and Addington County.

D'Allonne was born in the commune of Montargis in the Loiret department to Jacques de Roybon d’Allonne a soldier and minor French nobleman. She likely landed in New France in search of a husband but never married. She has been researched by historians because of her relationship with René-Robert Cavelier, Sieur de La Salle, a French explorer. Archival records first mention d'Allone and LaSalle's relationship on August 24, 1681 when she donated 2141 livres to him for a voyage after living in LaSalle's settlement for two years. La Salle was later charged with seducing d'Allone and reports claimed that they were to marry. D'Allone protested against the claim until it was clear that it was false.

In 1683 La Salle granted d'Allone a seigneury in Fort Frontenac (Collins Bay, Ontario). On her lands at Tonequinion, at Cataraqui she built a house, outbuildings and a trading post, grew crops and raised cattle. Iroquois, angry at the French for their campaign against the Seneca people in 1686, destroyed the d'Allone's establishment in August 1687, and took her prisoner. Released the following year, she settled permanently in Rue Saint-Vincent, Montréal where she lived until her death in 1718 at the age of 72.
