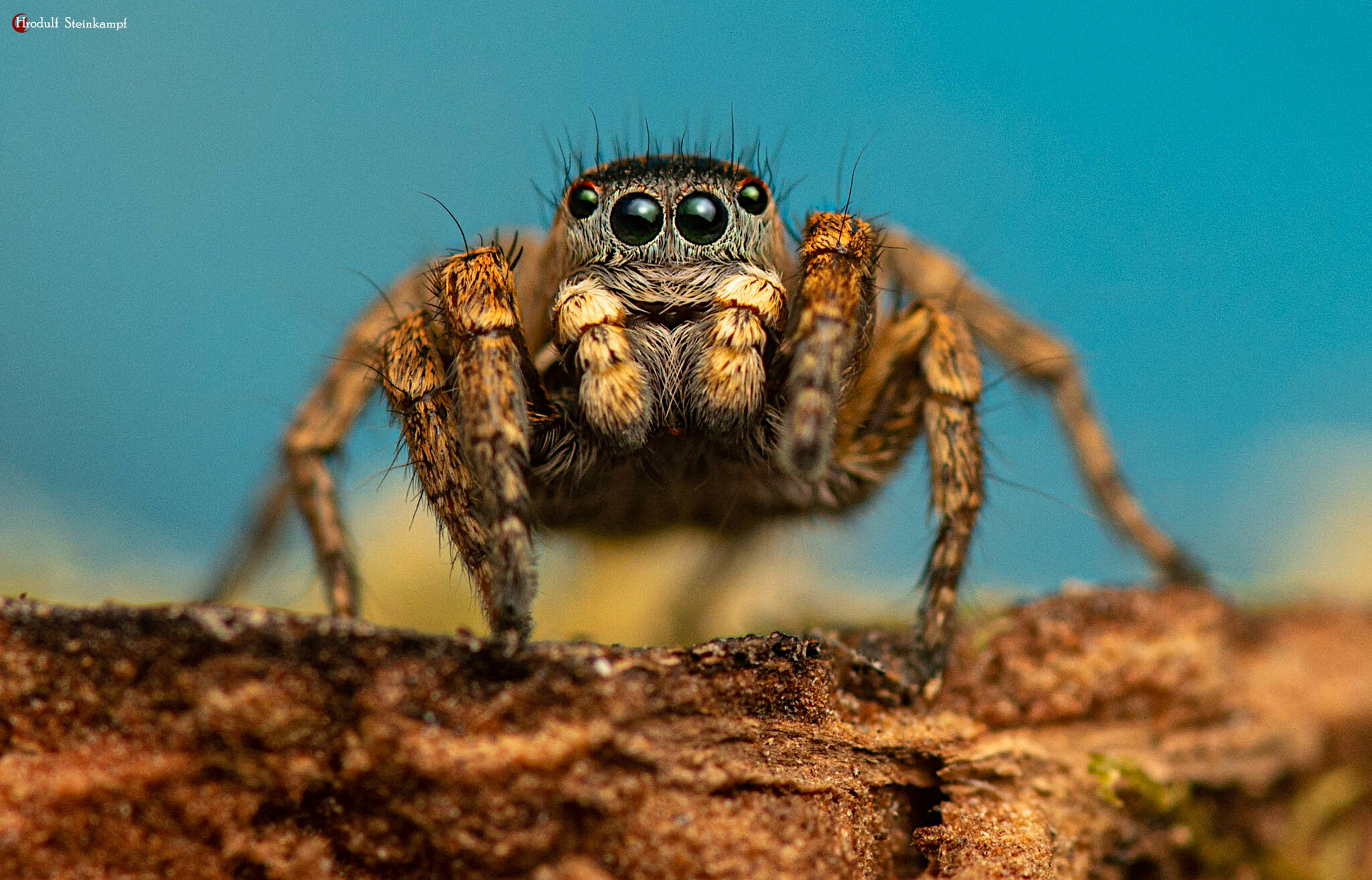

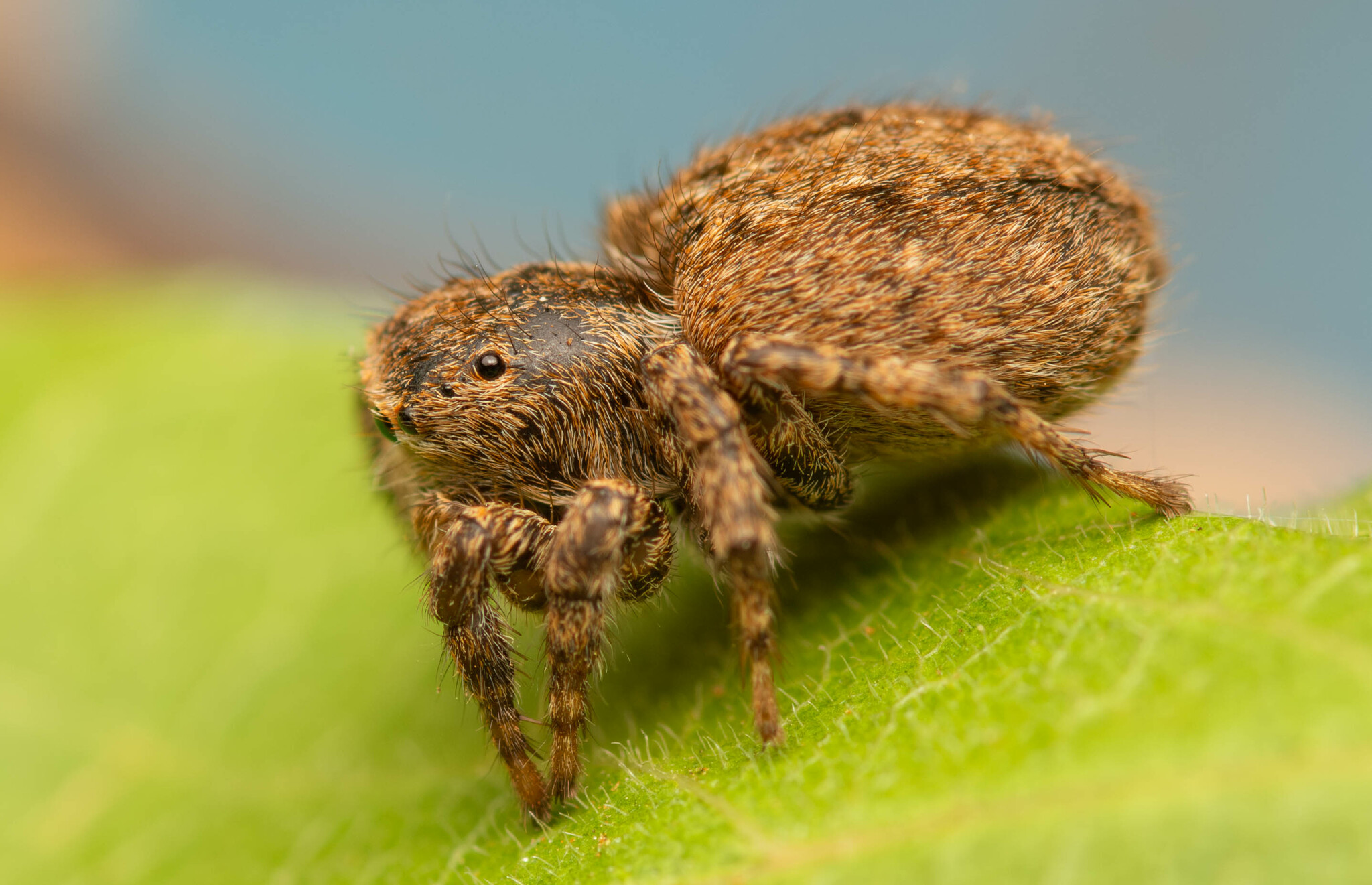

Scientific classification
- Kingdom: Animalia
- Phylum: Arthropoda
- Subphylum: Chelicerata
- Class: Arachnida
- Order: Araneae
- Infraorder: Araneomorphae
- Family: Salticidae
- Genus: Phlegra
- Species: P. karoo

Binomial name
- Phlegra karoo Wesołowska, 2006

= Phlegra karoo =

Species of spider

Phlegra karoo is a jumping spider species in the genus Phlegra. It was first identified by Wanda Wesołowska in 2006 and lives in Namibia, South Africa and Zimbabwe.
