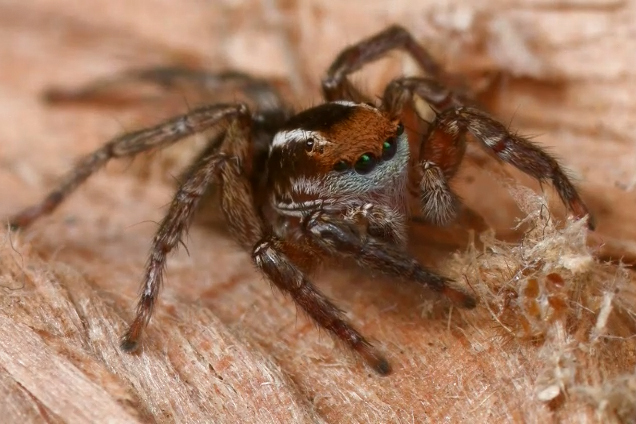

Scientific classification
- Kingdom: Animalia
- Phylum: Arthropoda
- Subphylum: Chelicerata
- Class: Arachnida
- Order: Araneae
- Infraorder: Araneomorphae
- Family: Salticidae
- Genus: Phlegra
- Species: P. hentzi

Binomial name
- Phlegra hentzi (Marx, 1890)

= Phlegra hentzi =

Species of arachnid

Phlegra hentzi is a species of jumping spider in the family Salticidae. It is found in the United States and Canada.

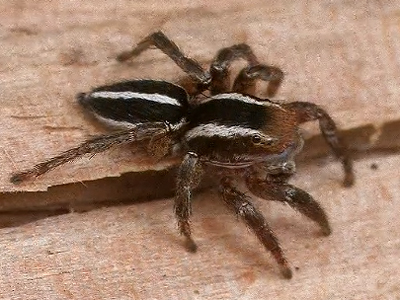
