= Phlegra tenella =

Scientific classification
- Kingdom: Animalia
- Phylum: Arthropoda
- Subphylum: Chelicerata
- Class: Arachnida
- Order: Araneae
- Infraorder: Araneomorphae
- Family: Salticidae
- Genus: Phlegra
- Species: P. tenella

Binomial name
- Phlegra tenella Wesołowska, 2006

Species of spider

Phlegra tenella is a jumping spider species in the genus Phlegra that lives in Namibia. The male was first described by Wanda Wesołowska in 2006, but the female has yet to be identified.
