= Phlegra pusilla =

Scientific classification
- Kingdom: Animalia
- Phylum: Arthropoda
- Subphylum: Chelicerata
- Class: Arachnida
- Order: Araneae
- Infraorder: Araneomorphae
- Family: Salticidae
- Genus: Phlegra
- Species: P. pusilla

Binomial name
- Phlegra pusilla Wesołowska & van Harten, 1994

Species of spider

Phlegra pusilla is a species of jumping spider in the genus Phlegra. The male was first described in 1994 from a sample from Yemen. The female was subsequently described in 2006, and the distribution of the species was identified across Africa from Senegal to Zimbabwe and into the Arabian Peninsula. The species is identified by a characteristic pattern on the carapace and the structure of the copulatory organs.

== History ==
The male was first described in 1994 by Wesołowska and van Harten, and the female by Logunov and Azarkin in 2006. The species was placed in the genus Phlegra with a name that translates "very little".

== Description ==
A small spider, Phlegra pusilla is identified by a characteristic colour pattern on the carapace, as well as by the structure of the copulatory organs. The male embolus has a thin, slightly twisted tip and a wide base and the female has a shallow rounded trench close to the epigastric furrow. The clypeus of males may also have a peculiar colour pattern of transverse brownish lines.

== Distribution ==
The species was first observed in Yemen and was subsequently found in locations across Africa from Senegal to Zimbabwe. Examples have been found in Kenya and Tanzania that were initially misidentified as Phlegra nuda. It was also identified in the United Arab Emirates based on samples also misidentified as Phlegra nuda.
