= Statue of Robert Cavelier de La Salle =

Statue in Chicago, Illinois, U.S.

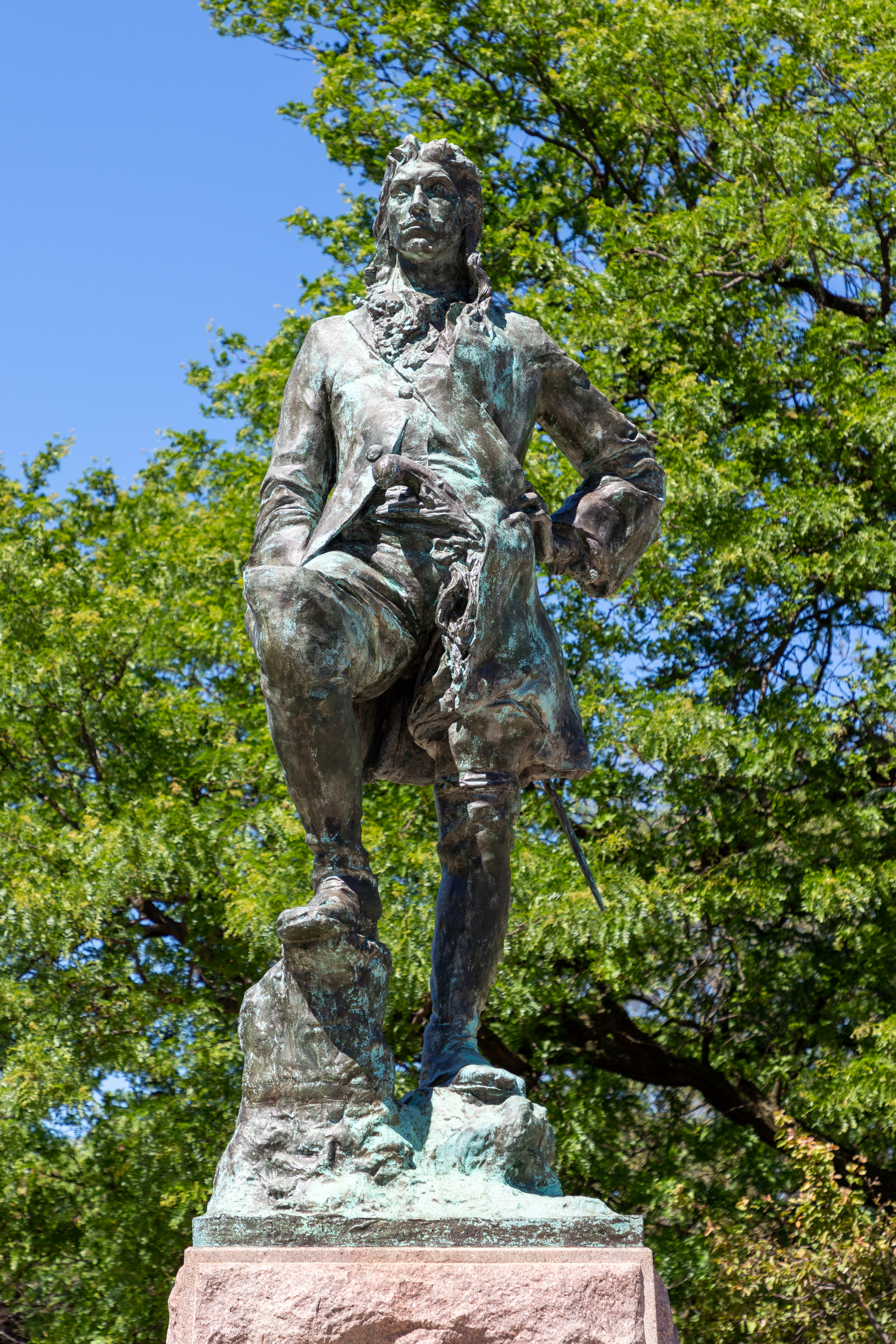
- The statue in 2020
- Location: 41°54′48.2″N 87°37′57.9″W

A statue of René-Robert Cavelier, Sieur de La Salle (sometimes called Robert Cavelier de LaSalle Monument) is installed in Chicago's Lincoln Park, in the U.S. state of Illinois. The work by Count Jacques de la Laing was completed in 1889 and relocated in 1990.
