= Eupithecia dissertata =

Scientific classification
- Kingdom: Animalia
- Phylum: Arthropoda
- Clade: Pancrustacea
- Class: Insecta
- Order: Lepidoptera
- Family: Geometridae
- Genus: Eupithecia
- Species: E. dissertata

Binomial name
- Eupithecia dissertata (Püngeler, 1905)

Synonyms
- Tephroclystia dissertata Püngeler, 1905; Eupithecia kaszabi Vojnits, 1974; Eupithecia certa Vojnits, 1981; Eupithecia perfuscata Vojnits, 1975

Species of moth

Eupithecia dissertata is a moth in the family Geometridae found in Europe and Asia.

In Asia, it has been recorded from Russia (the South Siberian Mountains), as well as northern Mongolia, southeastern Kazakhstan and parts of China (Qinghai, Gansu and Shanxi). In Europe, it has been collected from France, Switzerland, Italy and Slovakia.

In Europe, the species has been recorded on rocky limestone slopes at altitudes between 800 and 2000 meter. In Asia, it has been found at altitudes between 500 and 2950 meter.

Adults fly in a single generation from late June to August, have a wingspan of 18 to 24 mm, and can range in color from light grey to brown. The larvae feed on the flowers of Allium species, including Allium sphaerocephalon.
