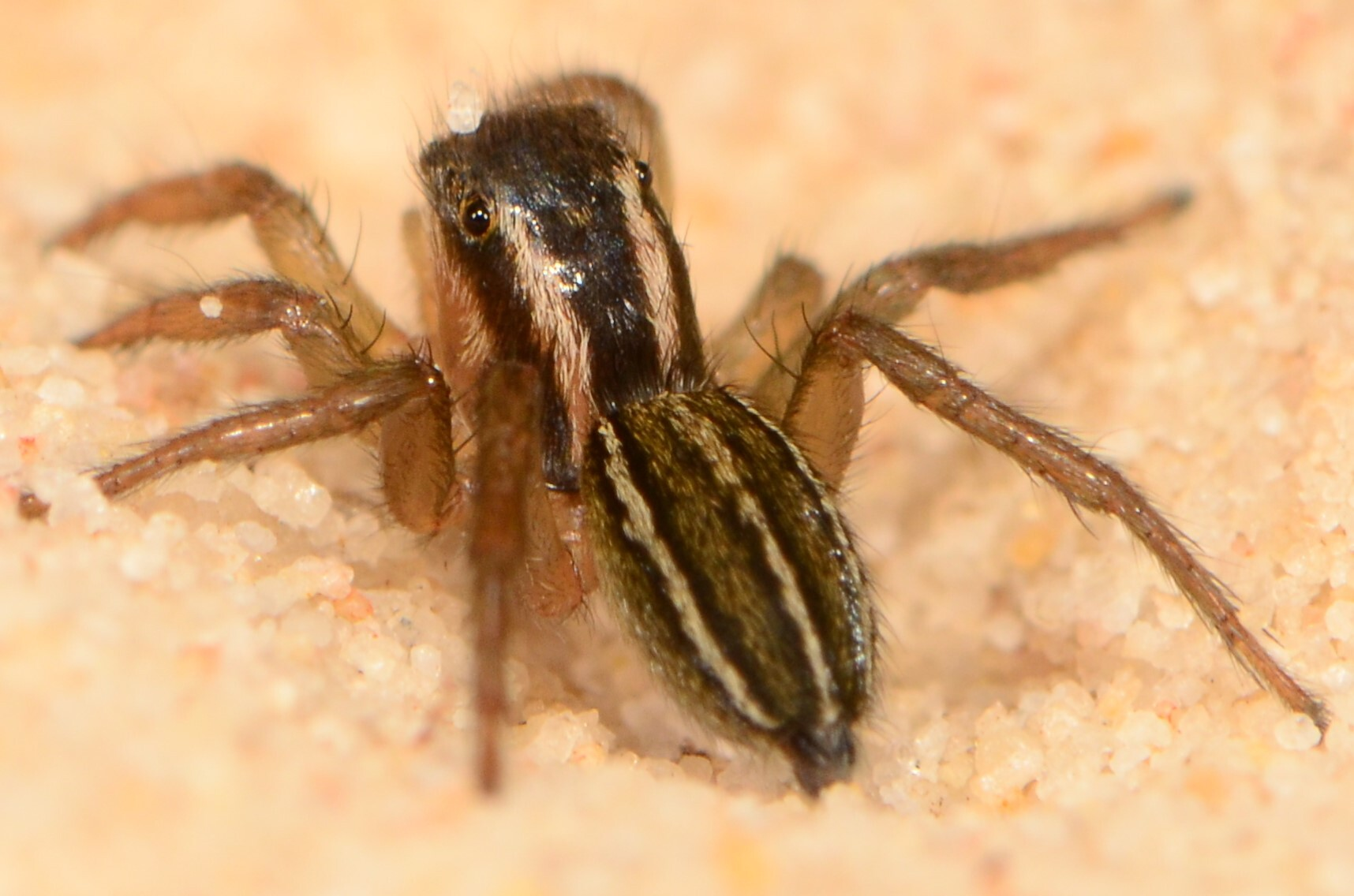
- female
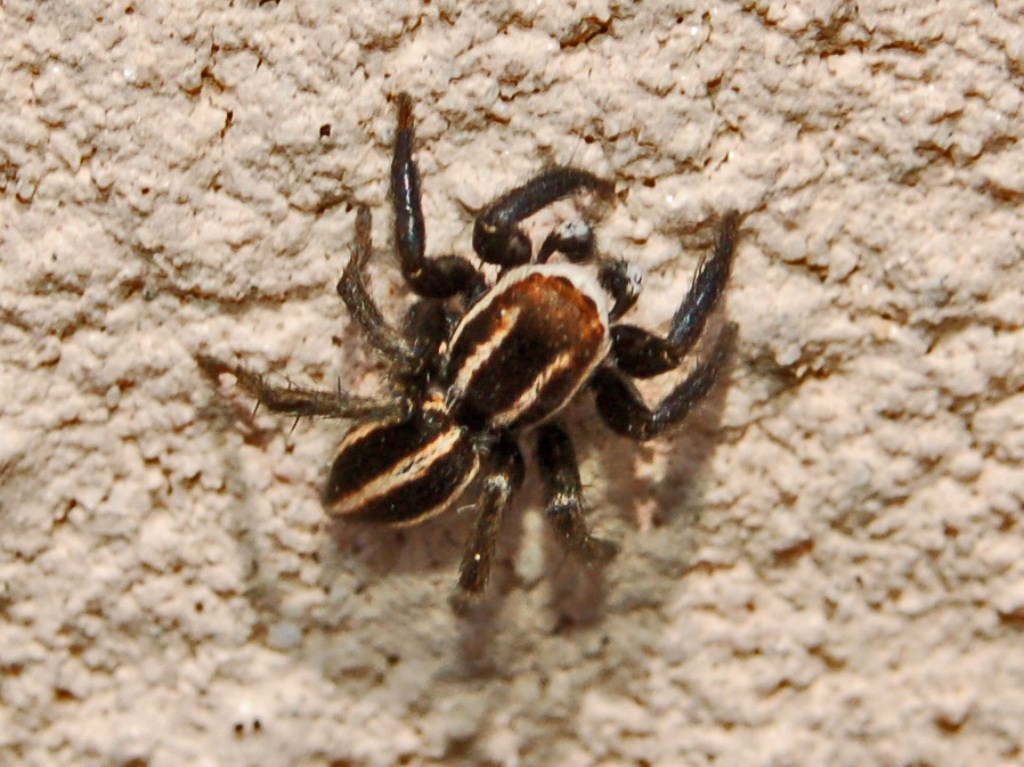
- male

Scientific classification
- Kingdom: Animalia
- Phylum: Arthropoda
- Subphylum: Chelicerata
- Class: Arachnida
- Order: Araneae
- Infraorder: Araneomorphae
- Family: Salticidae
- Genus: Phlegra
- Species: P. bresnieri

Binomial name
- Phlegra bresnieri (Lucas, 1846)

= Phlegra bresnieri =

Species of spider

Phlegra bresnieri is a species of jumping spiders (family Salticidae). Its specific name bresnieri honors the 19th-century French Arabist Louis-Jacques Bresnier.

This species is mainly present in southern Europe up to Azerbaijan, in Ivory Coast, and in Tanzania.

The adults of these spiders reach approximately 4–5 millimetres (0.16–0.20 in) of length.

In the males the carapace is elongated, dark brown or dark grey, with two white and wide longitudinal stripes, running from eyes to posterior edge. Clypeus is yellowish and completely covered of white hairs. The hairy abdomen is dark brown, long and slender, with a median and two lateral white stripes. Chelicerae are light brown, while sternum is dark brown. Pedipalps are brown, covered with black hairs.

These spiders have eight eyes, with very large anterior median eyes and smaller on each side. Their eyesight is excellent.

== Subspecies ==
- Phlegra bresnieri meridionalis (Strand, 1906) — Ethiopia
