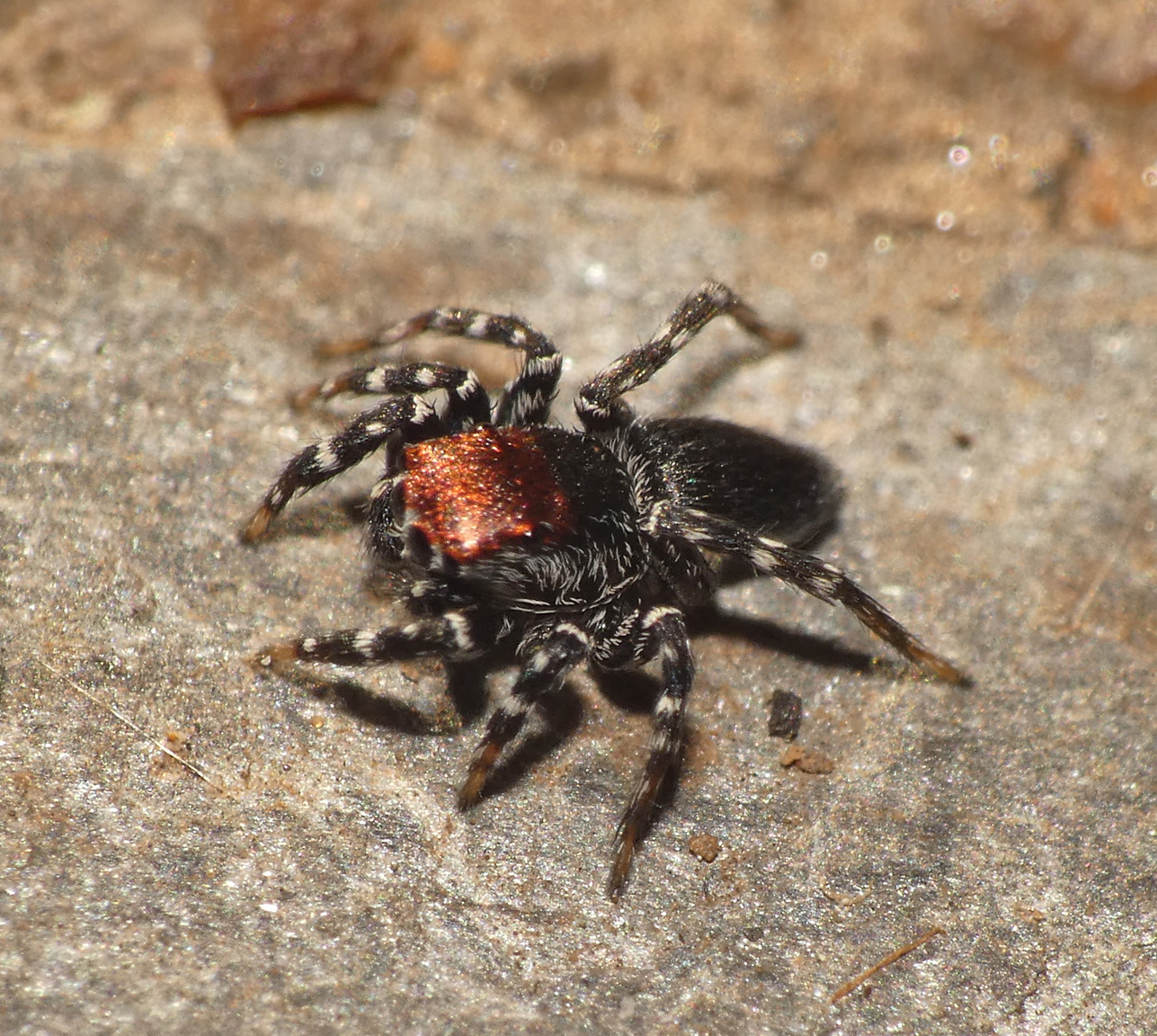

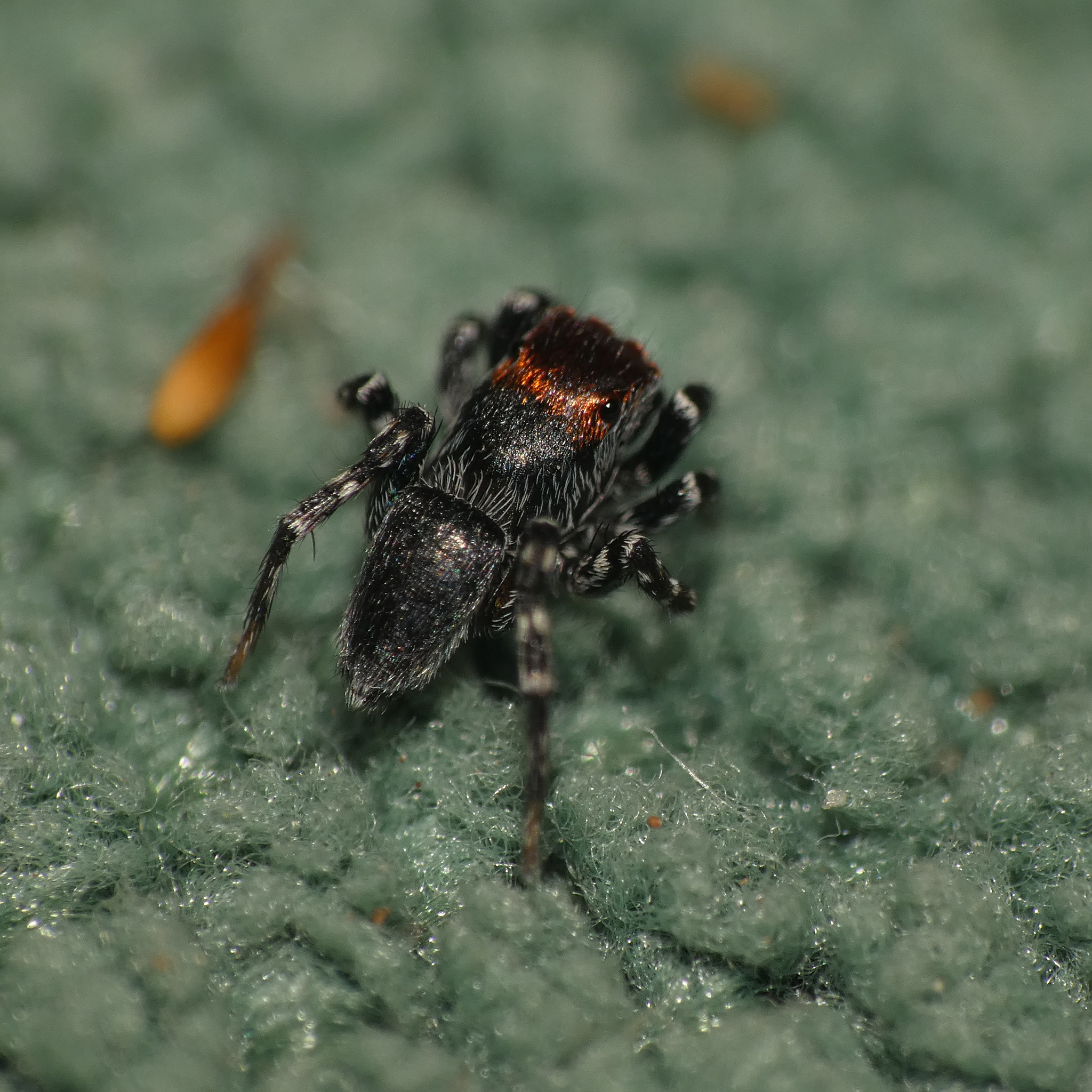

Scientific classification
- Kingdom: Animalia
- Phylum: Arthropoda
- Subphylum: Chelicerata
- Class: Arachnida
- Order: Araneae
- Infraorder: Araneomorphae
- Family: Salticidae
- Genus: Phlegra
- Species: P. certa

Binomial name
- Phlegra certa Wesołowska & Haddad, 2009

= Phlegra certa =

Species of spider

Phlegra certa is a jumping spider species in the genus Phlegra that lives in South Africa. The male was first described in 2009.
