= Louis-Jacques Bresnier =

French orientalist

- Born: 11 April 1814; Montargis
- Died: 21 June 1869 (aged 55); Algiers
- Occupation: Orientalist

Louis-Jacques Bresnier (11 April 1814 – 21 June 1869) was a 19th-century French orientalist. He died in Algiers of a stroke while entering the library where he would give his lesson.

He began his own oriental studies as an autodidact and brought them soon so far that he could attend the lectures of Étienne Marc Quatremère and Antoine-Isaac Silvestre de Sacy, thereby acquiring a thorough knowledge of the Arabic language and literature.

He was the first professor of Arabic in Algiers. In 1836, on the request of the Minister of War, M. de Sacy designated one of the best students of the École des langues orientales vivantes to found the teaching of the Arabic language in Algiers.

While his lessons formed around him the first interpreters, he devoted most of his leisure to compose a grammar.

We owe Bresnier several publications which are now reference books:

- 1846: La Djaroumia, l’Anthologie, la Chrestomathie arabe et les Principes élémentaires de la langue arabe
- 1852: Anthologie arabe élémentaire
- 1855: Le Cours pratique et théorique de langue arabe
- 1856: Chrestomathie arabe
- 1867: Principes de la langue arabe

== Sources ==
- (in French) Narcisse Faucon, Le Livre d'or de l'Algérie, Challamel et Cie Éditeurs, Librairie algérienne et coloniale, 1889
